= List of mammals of Suriname =

This is a list of the mammal species recorded in Suriname. This list is derived from the IUCN Red List which lists species of mammals and includes those mammals that have recently been classified as extinct (since 1500 AD). The taxonomy and naming of the individual species is based on those used in existing Wikipedia articles as of 21 May 2007 and supplemented by the common names and taxonomy from the IUCN, Smithsonian Institution, or University of Michigan where no Wikipedia article was available.

The following tags are used to highlight each species' conservation status as assessed by the International Union for Conservation of Nature:

EX	Extinct	No reasonable doubt that the last individual has died.
EW	Extinct in the wild	Known only to survive in captivity or as a naturalized populations well outside its previous range.
CR	Critically endangered	The species is in imminent risk of extinction in the wild.
EN	Endangered	The species is facing an extremely high risk of extinction in the wild.
VU	Vulnerable	The species is facing a high risk of extinction in the wild.
NT	Near threatened	The species does not meet any of the criteria that would categorise it as risking extinction but it is likely to do so in the future.
LC	Least concern	There are no current identifiable risks to the species.
DD	Data deficient	There is inadequate information to make an assessment of the risks to this species.

Some species were assessed using an earlier set of criteria. Species assessed using this system have the following instead of near threatened and least concern categories:

LR/cd	Lower risk/conservation dependent	Species which were the focus of conservation programmes and may have moved into a higher risk category if that programme was discontinued.
LR/nt	Lower risk/near threatened	Species which are close to being classified as vulnerable but are not the subject of conservation programmes.
LR/lc	Lower risk/least concern	Species for which there are no identifiable risks.

== Subclass: Theria ==
=== Infraclass: Eutheria ===
==== Order: Sirenia (manatees and dugongs) ====
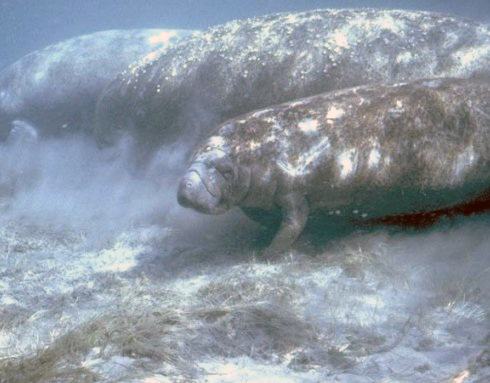
West Indian manatees

Sirenia is an order of fully aquatic, herbivorous mammals that inhabit rivers, estuaries, coastal marine waters, swamps, and marine wetlands. All four species are endangered.

- Family: Trichechidae
  - Genus: Trichechus
    - West Indian manatee, T. manatus VU

==== Order: Cingulata (armadillos) ====
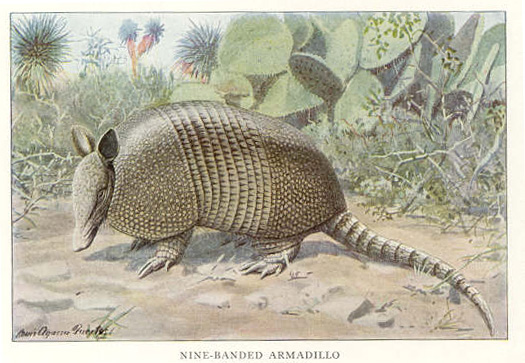
Nine-banded armadillo

The armadillos are small mammals with a bony armored shell. They are native to the Americas. There are around 20 extant species.

- Family: Dasypodidae (armadillos)
  - Subfamily: Dasypodinae
    - Genus: Dasypus
      - Greater long-nosed armadillo, D. kappleri LC
      - Nine-banded armadillo, D. novemcinctus LC
  - Subfamily: Euphractinae
    - Genus: Euphractus
      - Six-banded armadillo, Euphractus sexcinctus LC
  - Subfamily: Tolypeutinae
    - Genus: Cabassous
      - Southern naked-tailed armadillo, Cabassous unicinctus LC
    - Genus: Priodontes
      - Giant armadillo, Priodontes maximus VU

==== Order: Pilosa (anteaters, sloths and tamanduas) ====
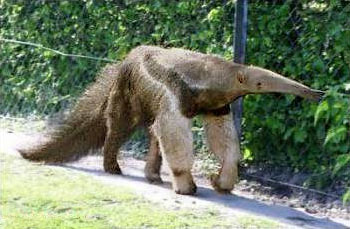
Giant anteater

The order Pilosa is extant only in the Americas and includes the anteaters, sloths, and tamanduas.

- Suborder: Folivora
  - Family: Bradypodidae (three-toed sloths)
    - Genus: Bradypus
      - Pale-throated three-toed sloth, Bradypus tridactylus LC
  - Family: Choloepodidae (two-toed sloths)
    - Genus: Choloepus
      - Linnaeus's two-toed sloth, Choloepus didactylus LC
- Suborder: Vermilingua
  - Family: Cyclopedidae
    - Genus: Cyclopes
      - Silky anteater, Cyclopes didactylus LC
  - Family: Myrmecophagidae (American anteaters)
    - Genus: Myrmecophaga
      - Giant anteater, Myrmecophaga tridactyla NT
    - Genus: Tamandua
      - Southern tamandua, Tamandua tetradactyla LC

==== Order: Primates ====
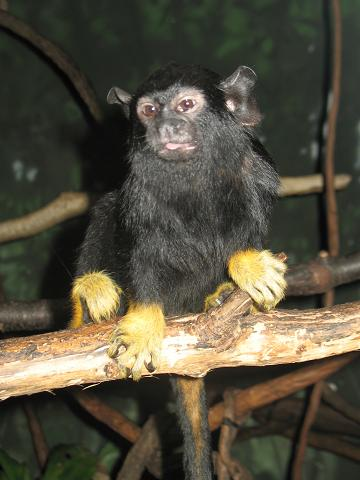
Red-handed tamarin

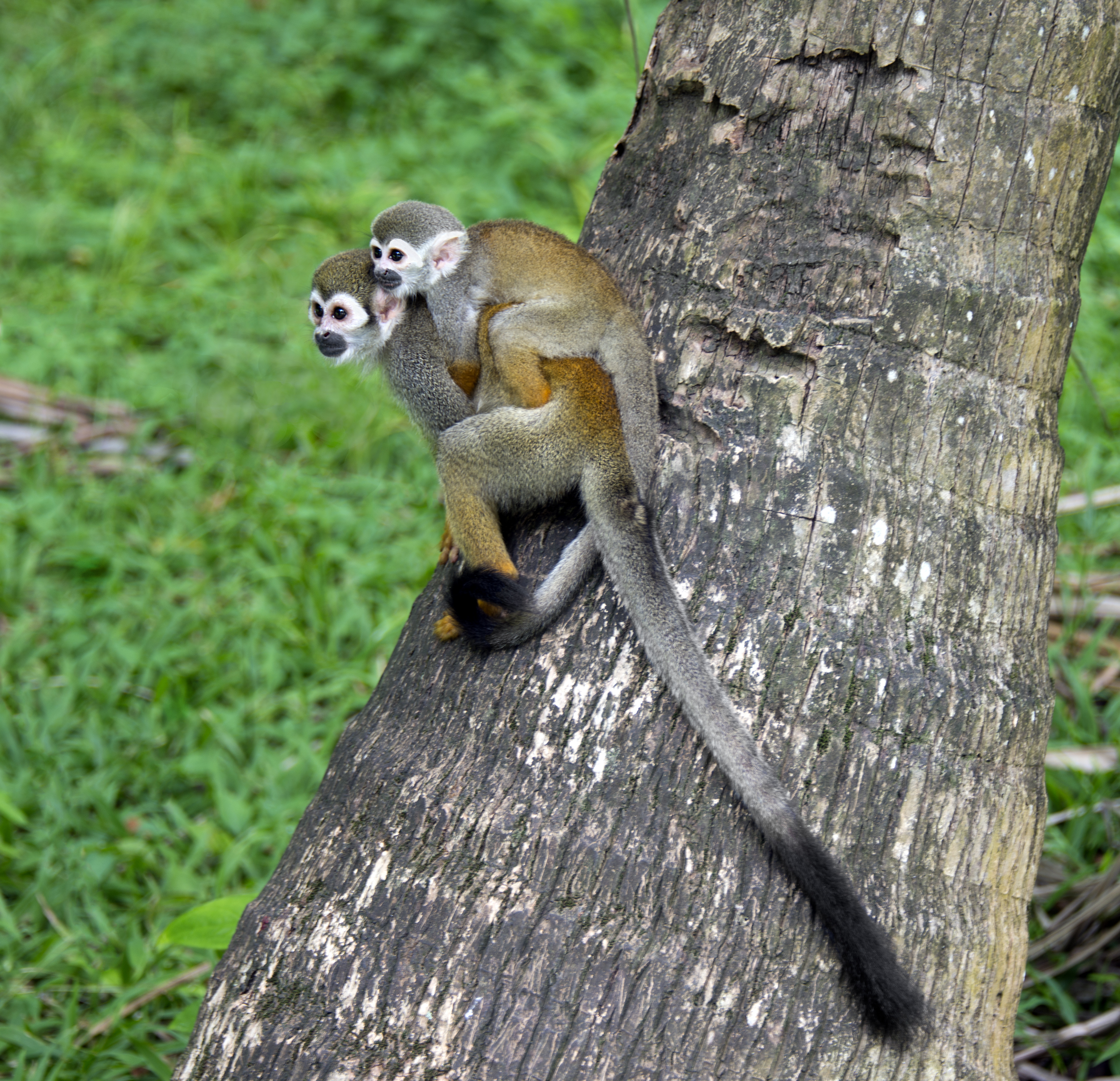
Guianan squirrel monkey

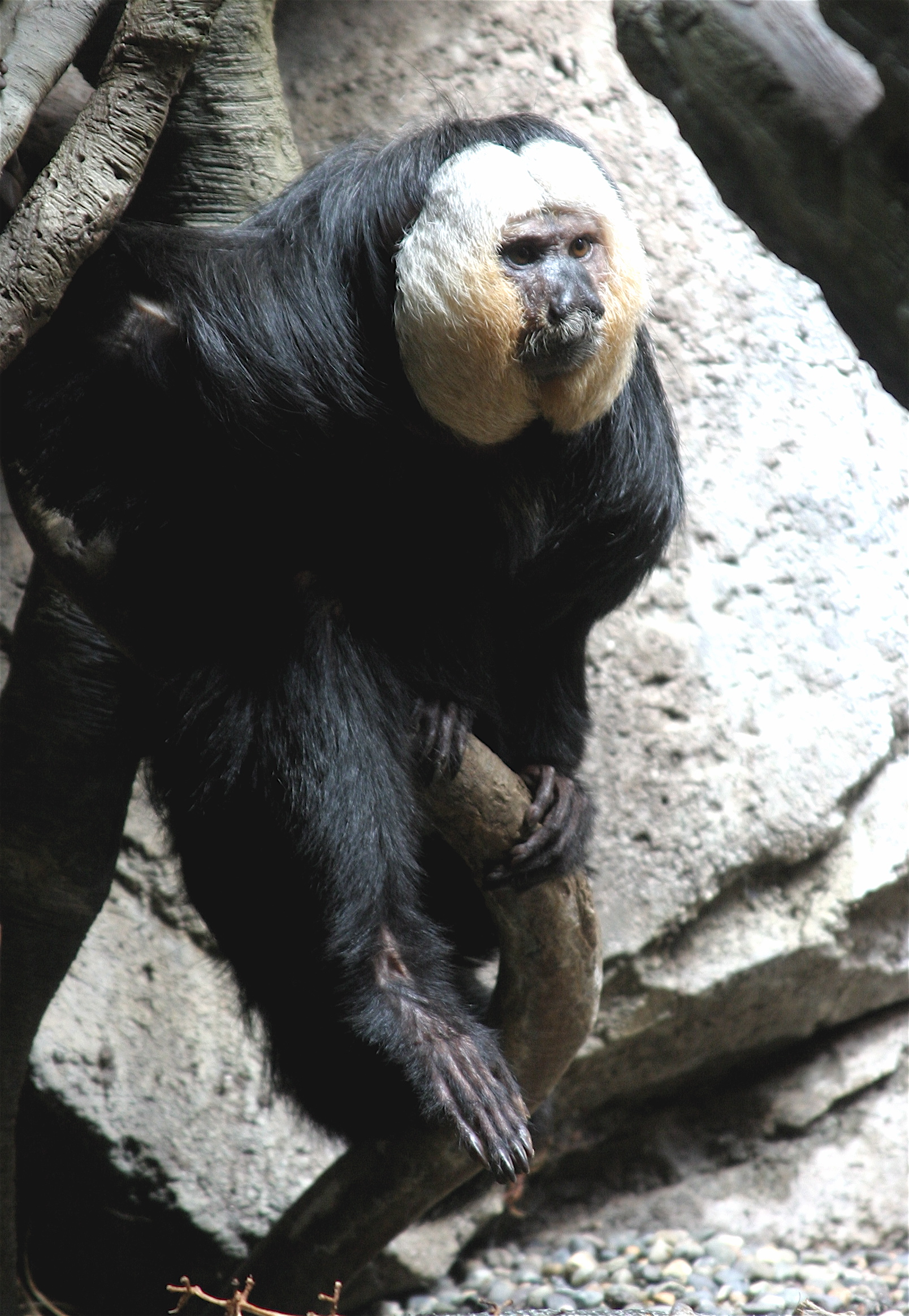
White-faced saki

The order Primates contains humans and their closest relatives: lemurs, lorisoids, monkeys, and apes.

- Suborder: Haplorhini
  - Infraorder: Simiiformes
    - Parvorder: Platyrrhini
      - Family: Callitrichidae
        - Genus: Saguinus
          - Red-handed tamarin, Saguinus midas LC
      - Family: Cebidae
        - Subfamily: Cebinae
          - Genus: Saimiri
            - Guianan squirrel monkey, Saimiri sciureus LC
          - Genus: Cebus
            - Chestnut capuchin, C. castaneus LC
            - Weeper capuchin, C. olivaceus LC
      - Family: Pitheciidae
        - Subfamily: Pitheciinae
          - Genus: Chiropotes
            - Red-backed bearded saki, Chiropotes chiropotes LC
            - Northern bearded saki, Chiropotes sagulatus LC
          - Genus: Pithecia
            - White-faced saki, Pithecia pithecia LC
      - Family: Atelidae
        - Subfamily: Alouattinae
          - Genus: Alouatta
            - Guyanan red howler, A. macconnelli LC
        - Subfamily: Atelinae
          - Genus: Ateles
            - Red-faced spider monkey, Ateles paniscus LC

==== Order: Rodentia (rodents) ====
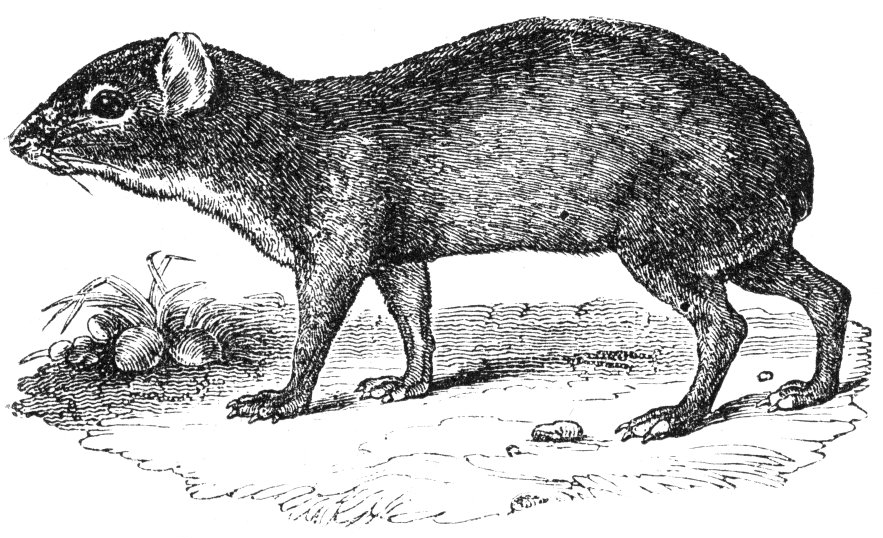
Black agouti

Rodents make up the largest order of mammals, with over 40% of mammalian species. They have two incisors in the upper and lower jaw which grow continually and must be kept short by gnawing. Most rodents are small though the capybara can weigh up to 45 kg (99 lb).

- Suborder: Hystricognathi
  - Family: Erethizontidae (New World porcupines)
    - Subfamily: Erethizontinae
      - Genus: Coendou
        - Brazilian porcupine, Coendou prehensilis LR/lc
  - Family: Caviidae (guinea pigs)
    - Subfamily: Caviinae
      - Genus: Cavia
        - Brazilian guinea pig, Cavia aperea LR/lc
        - Guinea pig, Cavia porcellus LR/lc
    - Subfamily: Hydrochoerinae (capybaras and rock cavies)
      - Genus: Hydrochoerus
        - Capybara, Hydrochoerus hydrochaeris LR/lc
    - Family: Dasyproctidae (agoutis and pacas)
      - Genus: Dasyprocta
        - Crested agouti, Dasyprocta cristata DD
        - Black agouti, Dasyprocta fuliginosa LR/lc
        - Red-rumped agouti, Dasyprocta leporina LR/lc
      - Genus: Myoprocta
        - Red acouchi, Myoprocta acouchy LR/lc
    - Family: Cuniculidae
      - Genus: Cuniculus
        - Lowland paca, Cuniculus paca LC
    - Family: Echimyidae
      - Subfamily: Echimyinae
        - Genus: Isothrix
          - Sinnamary brush-tailed rat, Isothrix sinnamariensis DD
        - Genus: Makalata
          - Brazilian spiny tree-rat, Makalata didelphoides LR/lc
      - Subfamily: Eumysopinae
        - Genus: Mesomys
          - Ferreira's spiny tree rat, Mesomys hispidus LR/lc
        - Genus: Proechimys
          - Guyenne spiny rat, Proechimys guyannensis LR/lc
          - Cuvier's spiny rat, Proechimys cuvieri LR/lc
- Suborder: Sciurognathi
    - Family: Sciuridae (squirrels)
      - Subfamily: Sciurillinae
        - Genus: Sciurillus
          - Neotropical pygmy squirrel, Sciurillus pusillus LR/lc
      - Subfamily: Sciurinae
        - Tribe: Sciurini
          - Genus: Sciurus
            - Brazilian squirrel, Sciurus aestuans LR/lc
    - Family: Cricetidae
      - Subfamily: Sigmodontinae
        - Genus: Holochilus
          - Amazonian marsh rat, Holochilus sciureus LR/lc
        - Genus: Neacomys
          - Guiana bristly mouse, Neacomys guianae LR/lc
          - Common bristly mouse, Neacomys spinosus LR/lc
        - Genus: Oecomys
          - Bicolored arboreal rice rat, Oecomys bicolor LR/lc
          - Brazilian arboreal rice rat, Oecomys paricola LR/lc
          - King arboreal rice at, Oecomys rex LR/lc
          - Robert's arboreal rice rat, Oecomys roberti LR/lc
          - Red arboreal rice rat, Oecomys rutilus LR/lc
          - Trinidad arboreal rice rat, Oecomys trinitatis LR/lc
        - Genus: Oligoryzomys
          - Fulvous pygmy rice rat, Oligoryzomys fulvescens LR/lc
        - Genus: Oryzomys
          - Azara's broad-headed rice rat, Oryzomys megacephalus LR/lc
          - Yungas rice rat, Oryzomys yunganus LR/lc
        - Genus: Rhipidomys
          - White-footed climbing mouse, Rhipidomys leucodactylus LR/lc
          - Splendid climbing mouse, Rhipidomys nitela LR/lc
        - Genus: Sigmodon
          - Alston's cotton rat, Sigmodon alstoni LR/lc
        - Genus: Zygodontomys
          - Short-tailed cane rat, Zygodontomys brevicauda LR/lc

==== Order: Lagomorpha (lagomorphs) ====
The lagomorphs comprise two families, Leporidae (hares and rabbits), and Ochotonidae (pikas). Though they can resemble rodents, and were classified as a superfamily in that order until the early 20th century, they have since been considered a separate order. They differ from rodents in a number of physical characteristics, such as having four incisors in the upper jaw rather than two.

  - Family: Leporidae (rabbits, hares)
    - Genus: Sylvilagus
      - Suriname lowland forest cottontail, Sylvilagus parentum NE

==== Order: Chiroptera (bats) ====
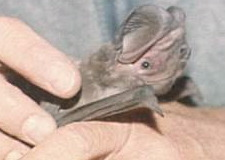
Western mastiff bat

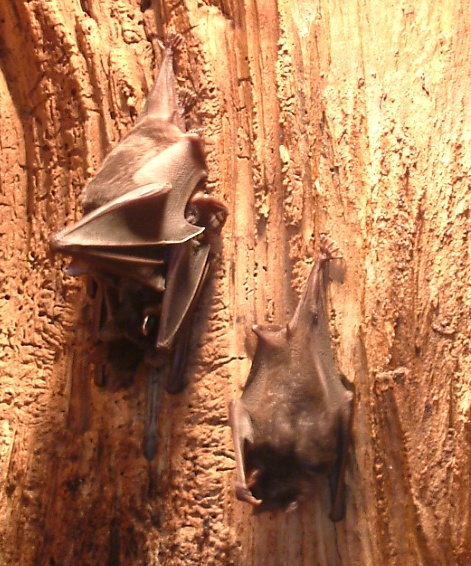
Pale spear-nosed bat

The bats' most distinguishing feature is that their forelimbs are developed as wings, making them the only mammals capable of flight. Bat species account for about 20% of all mammals.

  - Family: Noctilionidae
    - Genus: Noctilio
      - Lesser bulldog bat, Noctilio albiventris LR/lc
      - Greater bulldog bat, Noctilio leporinus LR/lc
  - Family: Vespertilionidae
    - Subfamily: Myotinae
      - Genus: Myotis
        - Silver-tipped myotis, Myotis albescens LR/lc
        - Black myotis, Myotis nigricans LR/lc
        - Riparian myotis, Myotis riparius LR/lc
    - Subfamily: Vespertilioninae
      - Genus: Eptesicus
        - Brazilian brown bat, Eptesicus brasiliensis LR/lc
        - Argentine brown bat, Eptesicus furinalis LR/lc
        - Big brown bat, Eptesicus fuscus LR/lc
      - Genus: Lasiurus
        - Greater red bat, Lasiurus atratus DD
        - Desert red bat, Lasiurus blossevillii LR/lc
        - Southern yellow bat, Lasiurus ega LR/lc
  - Family: Molossidae
    - Genus: Cynomops
      - Cinnamon dog-faced bat, Cynomops abrasus LR/nt
      - Greenhall's dog-faced bat, Cynomops greenhalli LR/lc
      - Southern dog-faced bat, Cynomops planirostris LR/lc
    - Genus: Eumops
      - Dwarf bonneted bat, Eumops bonariensis LR/lc
      - Wagner's bonneted bat, Eumops glaucinus LR/lc
      - Guianan bonneted bat, Eumops maurus VU
      - Western mastiff bat, Eumops perotis LR/lc
    - Genus: Molossops
      - Rufous dog-faced bat, Molossops neglectus LR/nt
    - Genus: Molossus
      - Black mastiff bat, Molossus ater LR/lc
      - Velvety free-tailed bat, Molossus molossus LR/lc
      - Sinaloan mastiff bat, Molossus sinaloae LR/lc
    - Genus: Nyctinomops
      - Peale's free-tailed bat, Nyctinomops aurispinosus LR/lc
      - Broad-eared bat, Nyctinomops laticaudatus LR/lc
      - Big free-tailed bat, Nyctinomops macrotis LR/lc
    - Genus: Promops
      - Big crested mastiff bat, Promops centralis LR/lc
      - Brown mastiff bat, Promops nasutus LR/lc
  - Family: Emballonuridae
    - Genus: Centronycteris
      - Shaggy bat, Centronycteris maximiliani LR/lc
    - Genus: Cormura
      - Wagner's sac-winged bat, Cormura brevirostris LR/lc
    - Genus: Diclidurus
      - Northern ghost bat, Diclidurus albus LR/lc
      - Lesser ghost bat, Diclidurus scutatus LR/lc
    - Genus: Peropteryx
      - Greater dog-like bat, Peropteryx kappleri LR/lc
      - White-winged dog-like bat, Peropteryx leucoptera LR/lc
    - Genus: Rhynchonycteris
      - Proboscis bat, Rhynchonycteris naso LR/lc
    - Genus: Saccopteryx
      - Greater sac-winged bat, Saccopteryx bilineata LR/lc
      - Frosted sac-winged bat, Saccopteryx canescens LR/lc
      - Lesser sac-winged bat, Saccopteryx leptura LR/lc
  - Family: Mormoopidae
    - Genus: Pteronotus
      - Naked-backed bat, Pteronotus davyi LR/lc
      - Parnell's mustached bat, Pteronotus parnellii LR/lc
      - Wagner's mustached bat, Pteronotus personatus LR/lc
  - Family: Phyllostomidae
    - Subfamily: Phyllostominae
      - Genus: Glyphonycteris
        - Davies's big-eared bat, Glyphonycteris daviesi LR/nt
      - Genus: Lampronycteris
        - Yellow-throated big-eared bat, Lampronycteris brachyotis LR/lc
      - Genus: Lonchorhina
        - Tomes's sword-nosed bat, Lonchorhina aurita LR/lc
        - Northern sword-nosed bat, Lonchorhina inusitata DD
      - Genus: Lophostoma
        - Pygmy round-eared bat, Lophostoma brasiliense LR/lc
        - Carriker's round-eared bat, Lophostoma carrikeri VU
        - Schultz's round-eared bat, Lophostoma schulzi VU
        - White-throated round-eared bat, Lophostoma silvicolum LR/lc
      - Genus: Macrophyllum
        - Long-legged bat, Macrophyllum macrophyllum LR/lc
      - Genus: Micronycteris
        - Hairy big-eared bat, Micronycteris hirsuta LR/lc
        - Little big-eared bat, Micronycteris megalotis LR/lc
        - White-bellied big-eared bat, Micronycteris minuta LR/lc
      - Genus: Mimon
        - Golden bat, Mimon bennettii LR/lc
        - Striped hairy-nosed bat, Mimon crenulatum LR/lc
      - Genus: Phylloderma
        - Pale-faced bat, Phylloderma stenops LR/lc
      - Genus: Phyllostomus
        - Pale spear-nosed bat, Phyllostomus discolor LR/lc
        - Lesser spear-nosed bat, Phyllostomus elongatus LR/lc
        - Greater spear-nosed bat, Phyllostomus hastatus LR/lc
      - Genus: Tonatia
        - Stripe-headed round-eared bat, Tonatia saurophila LR/lc
      - Genus: Trachops
        - Fringe-lipped bat, Trachops cirrhosus LR/lc
      - Genus: Trinycteris
        - Niceforo's big-eared bat, Trinycteris nicefori LR/lc
      - Genus: Vampyrum
        - Spectral bat, Vampyrum spectrum LR/nt
    - Subfamily: Lonchophyllinae
      - Genus: Lionycteris
        - Chestnut long-tongued bat, Lionycteris spurrelli LR/lc
      - Genus: Lonchophylla
        - Thomas's nectar bat, Lonchophylla thomasi LR/lc
    - Subfamily: Glossophaginae
      - Genus: Anoura
        - Tailed tailless bat, Anoura caudifer LR/lc
        - Geoffroy's tailless bat, Anoura geoffroyi LR/lc
      - Genus: Choeroniscus
        - Godman's long-tailed bat, Choeroniscus godmani LR/nt
        - Minor long-nosed long-tongued bat, Choeroniscus minor LR/lc
      - Genus: Glossophaga
        - Pallas's long-tongued bat, Glossophaga soricina LR/lc
      - Genus: Lichonycteris
        - Dark long-tongued bat, Lichonycteris obscura LR/lc
    - Subfamily: Carolliinae
      - Genus: Carollia
        - Chestnut short-tailed bat, Carollia castanea LR/lc
        - Seba's short-tailed bat, Carollia perspicillata LR/lc
      - Genus: Rhinophylla
        - Dwarf little fruit bat, Rhinophylla pumilio LR/lc
    - Subfamily: Stenodermatinae
      - Genus: Ametrida
        - Little white-shouldered bat, Ametrida centurio LR/lc
      - Genus: Artibeus
        - Gervais's fruit-eating bat, Artibeus cinereus LR/lc
        - Jamaican fruit bat, Artibeus jamaicensis LR/lc
        - Great fruit-eating bat, Artibeus lituratus LR/lc
      - Genus: Chiroderma
        - Little big-eyed bat, Chiroderma trinitatum LR/lc
        - Hairy big-eyed bat, Chiroderma villosum LR/lc
      - Genus: Mesophylla
        - MacConnell's bat, Mesophylla macconnelli LR/lc
      - Genus: Pygoderma
        - Ipanema bat, Pygoderma bilabiatum LR/nt
      - Genus: Sturnira
        - Little yellow-shouldered bat, Sturnira lilium LR/lc
        - Tilda's yellow-shouldered bat, Sturnira tildae LR/lc
      - Genus: Uroderma
        - Tent-making bat, Uroderma bilobatum LR/lc
        - Brown tent-making bat, Uroderma magnirostrum LR/lc
      - Genus: Vampyressa
        - Bidentate yellow-eared bat, Vampyressa bidens LR/nt
        - Brock's yellow-eared bat, Vampyressa brocki LR/nt
        - Southern little yellow-eared bat, Vampyressa pusilla LR/lc
      - Genus: Vampyrodes
        - Great stripe-faced bat, Vampyrodes caraccioli LR/lc
      - Genus: Platyrrhinus
        - Eldorado broad-nosed bat, Platyrrhinus aurarius LR/nt
        - Short-headed broad-nosed bat, Platyrrhinus brachycephalus LR/lc
        - Heller's broad-nosed bat, Platyrrhinus helleri LR/lc
    - Subfamily: Desmodontinae
      - Genus: Desmodus
        - Common vampire bat, Desmodus rotundus LR/lc
      - Genus: Diaemus
        - White-winged vampire bat, Diaemus youngi LR/lc
  - Family: Furipteridae
    - Genus: Furipterus
      - Thumbless bat, Furipterus horrens LR/lc
  - Family: Thyropteridae
    - Genus: Thyroptera
      - Peters's disk-winged bat, Thyroptera discifera LR/lc
      - Spix's disk-winged bat, Thyroptera tricolor LR/lc

==== Order: Cetacea (whales) ====
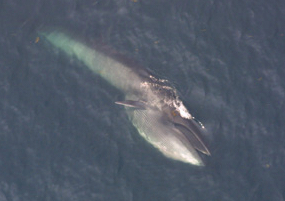
Sei whale

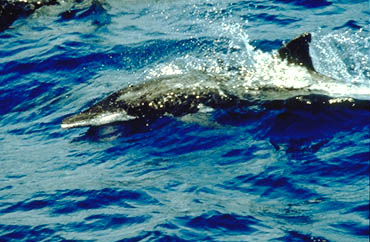
Rough-toothed dolphin

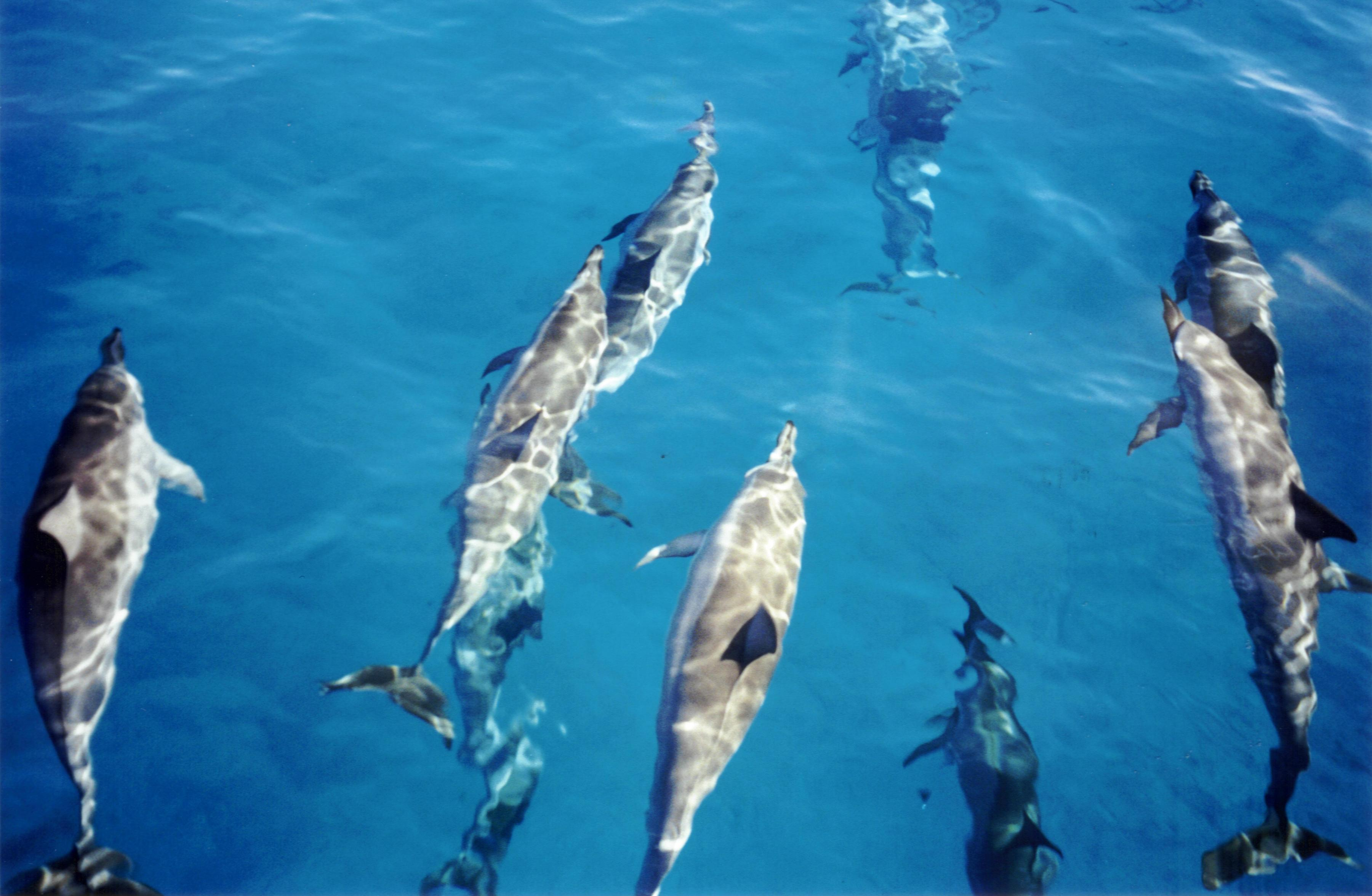
Spinner dolphins

The order Cetacea includes whales, dolphins and porpoises. They are the mammals most fully adapted to aquatic life with a spindle-shaped nearly hairless body, protected by a thick layer of blubber, and forelimbs and tail modified to provide propulsion underwater. Cetaceans found off of Suriname's coastline primarily inhabit the Caribbean Sea and the Atlantic Ocean.

- Suborder: Mysticeti
  - Family: Balaenopteridae
    - Genus: Balaenoptera
      - Common minke whale, Balaenoptera acutorostrata
      - Sei whale, Balaenoptera borealis
      - Bryde's whale, Balaenoptera brydei
      - Blue whale, Balaenoptera musculus
      - Fin whale, Balaenoptera physalus
    - Genus: Megaptera
      - Humpback whale, Megaptera novaeangliae
- Suborder: Odontoceti
  - Superfamily: Platanistoidea
    - Family: Delphinidae (marine dolphins)
      - Genus: Steno
        - Rough-toothed dolphin, Steno bredanensis DD
      - Genus: Sotalia
        - Costero, Sotalia guianensis DD
      - Genus: Stenella
        - Pantropical spotted dolphin, Stenella attenuata DD
        - Clymene dolphin, Stenella clymene DD
        - Striped dolphin, Stenella coeruleoalba DD
        - Atlantic spotted dolphin, Stenella frontalis DD
        - Spinner dolphin, Stenella longirostris LR/cd
      - Genus: Tursiops
        - Common bottlenose dolphin, Tursiops truncatus LR/cd
      - Genus: Delphinus
        - Long-beaked common dolphin, Delphinus capensis LR/lc
      - Genus: Lagenodelphis
        - Fraser's dolphin, Lagenodelphis hosei DD
      - Genus: Feresa
        - Pygmy killer whale, Feresa attenuata DD
      - Genus: Orcinus
        - Killer whale, Orcinus orca DD
      - Genus: Peponocephala
        - Melon-headed whale, Peponocephala electra DD
    - Family: Physeteridae (sperm whales)
      - Genus: Physeter
        - Sperm whale, Physeter macrocephalus VU
    - Family: Kogiidae (small sperm whales)
      - Genus: Kogia
        - Pygmy sperm whale, Kogia breviceps DD
        - Dwarf sperm whale, Kogia sima DD
- Superfamily Ziphioidea
  - Family: Ziphidae (beaked whales)
    - Genus: Mesoplodon
      - Blainville's beaked whale, Mesoplodon densirostris DD
      - Gervais' beaked whale, Mesoplodon europaeus DD
    - Genus: Ziphius
      - Cuvier's beaked whale, Ziphius cavirostris DD

==== Order: Carnivora (carnivorans) ====
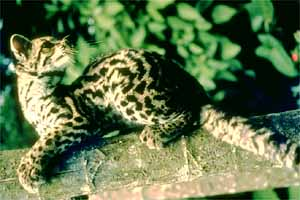
Margay

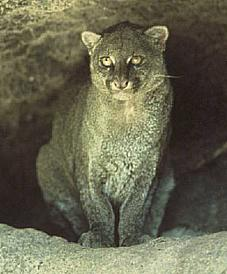
Jaguarundi

There are over 260 species of carnivorans, worldwide, ranging from cats and dogs to mustelids and pinnipeds. They feed primarily on the flesh of other animals, and only very rarely will supplement their diet with plant matter (such as the kinkajou). Some species, however, are more omnivorous or insectivorous than others, while others (such as foxes) are opportunistic feeders. They have a characteristic skull shape and dentition.

- Suborder: Feliformia
  - Family: Felidae (cats)
    - Subfamily: Felinae
      - Genus: Leopardus
        - Ocelot L. pardalis LC
        - Oncilla L. tigrinus VU
        - Margay L. wiedii NT
      - Genus: Herpailurus
        - Jaguarundi, H. yagouaroundi LC
      - Genus: Puma
        - Cougar, P. concolor LC
    - Subfamily: Pantherinae
      - Genus: Panthera
        - Jaguar, P. onca NT
  - Family: Herpestidae
    - Genus: Urva
      - Small Indian mongoose, U. auropunctata LC introduced
- Suborder: Caniformia
  - Family: Canidae (dogs, foxes)
    - Genus: Cerdocyon
      - Crab-eating fox, Cerdocyon thous LC
    - Genus: Speothos
      - Bush dog, Speothos venaticus VU
  - Family: Procyonidae (raccoons)
    - Genus: Procyon
      - Crab-eating raccoon, Procyon cancrivorus
    - Genus: Nasua
      - South American coati, Nasua nasua
    - Genus: Potos
      - Kinkajou, Potos flavus
  - Family: Mustelidae (mustelids)
    - Genus: Eira
      - Tayra, Eira barbara
    - Genus: Galictis
      - Greater grison, Galictis vittata
    - Genus: Lontra
      - Neotropical river otter, Lontra longicaudis DD
    - Genus: Pteronura
      - Giant otter, Pteronura brasiliensis EN
  - Family: Mephitidae
    - Genus: Conepatus
      - Striped hog-nosed skunk, Conepatus semistriatus

==== Order: Perissodactyla (odd-toed ungulates) ====
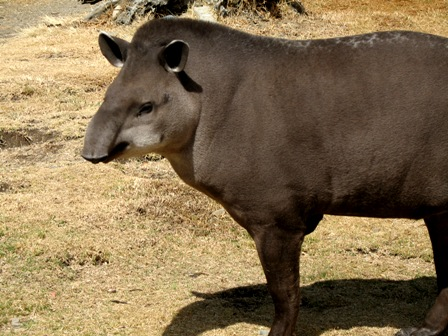
Brazilian tapir

The odd-toed ungulates are browsing and grazing mammals. They are usually large to very large, and have relatively simple stomachs and a large middle toe.

- Family: Tapiridae (tapirs)
  - Genus: Tapirus
    - Brazilian tapir, Tapirus terrestris VU

==== Order: Artiodactyla (even-toed ungulates) ====
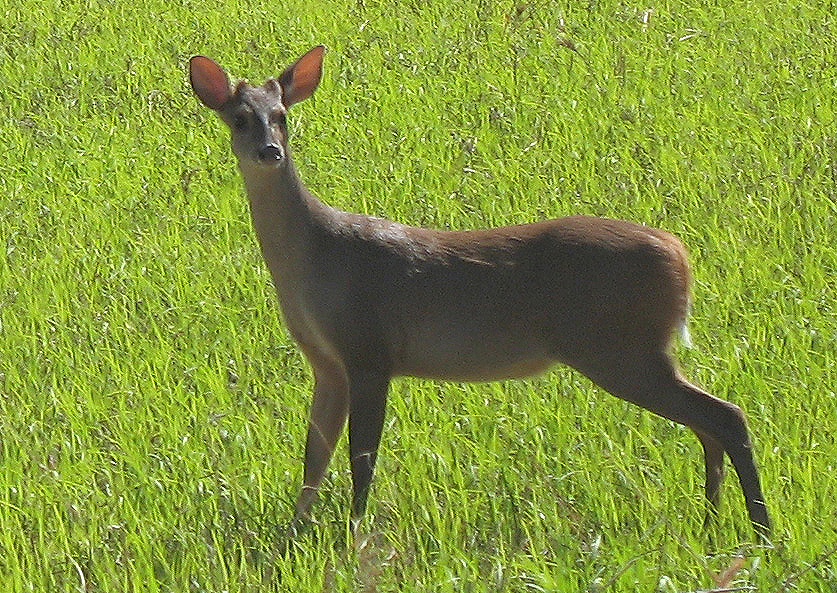
Red brocket

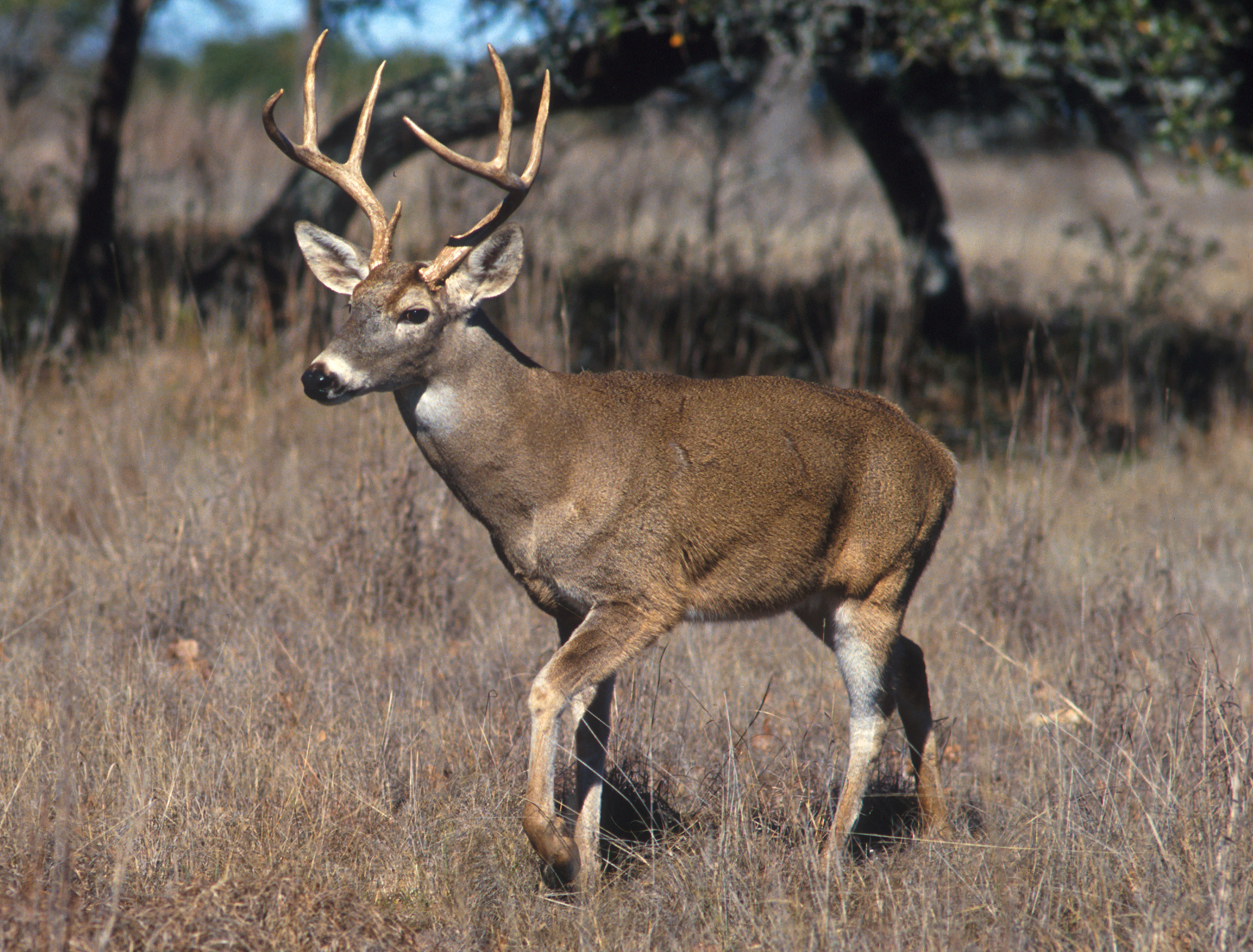
White-tailed deer

The even-toed ungulates are ungulates whose weight is borne about equally by the third and fourth toes, rather than mostly or entirely by the third as in perissodactyls. There are about 220 artiodactyl species, including many that are of great economic importance to humans.

- Family: Tayassuidae (peccaries)
  - Genus: Dicotyles
    - Collared peccary, Dicotyles tajacu LC
  - Genus: Tayassu
    - White-lipped peccary, Tayassu pecari NT
- Family: Cervidae (deer)
  - Subfamily: Capreolinae
    - Genus: Mazama
      - Red brocket, Mazama americana DD
      - Gray brocket, Mazama gouazoupira DD
    - Genus: Odocoileus
      - White-tailed deer, Odocoileus virginianus LR/lc

=== Infraclass: Metatheria ===
==== Order: Didelphimorphia (common opossums) ====
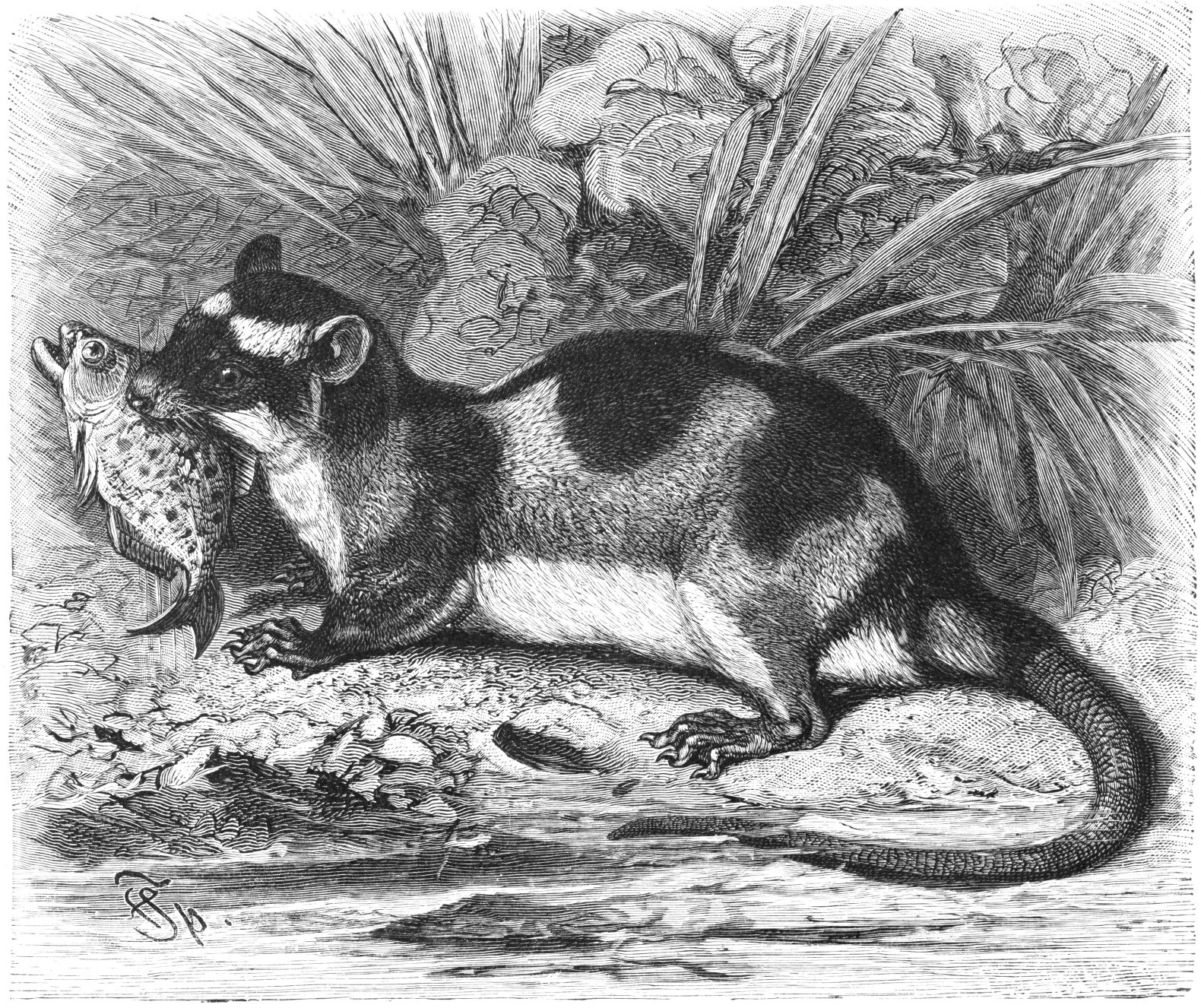
Water opossum

Didelphimorphia is the order of common opossums of the Western Hemisphere. Opossums probably diverged from the basic South American marsupials in the late Cretaceous or early Paleocene. They are small to medium-sized marsupials, about the size of a large house cat, with a long snout and prehensile tail.

- Family: Didelphidae (American opossums)
  - Subfamily: Caluromyinae
    - Genus: Caluromys
      - Bare-tailed woolly opossum, Caluromys philander LR/nt
  - Subfamily: Didelphinae
    - Genus: Chironectes
      - Water opossum, Chironectes minimus LR/nt
    - Genus: Didelphis
      - White-eared opossum, Didelphis albiventris LR/lc
      - Guianan white-eared opossum, Didelphis imperfecta LR/lc
      - Common opossum, Didelphis marsupialis LR/lc
    - Genus: Marmosa
      - Woolly mouse opossum, Marmosa demerarae LR/lc
      - Rufous mouse opossum, Marmosa lepida LR/nt
      - Linnaeus's mouse opossum, Marmosa murina LR/lc
    - Genus: Marmosops
      - Delicate slender opossum, Marmosops parvidens LR/nt
    - Genus: Metachirus
      - Brown four-eyed opossum, Metachirus nudicaudatus LR/lc
    - Genus: Monodelphis
      - Northern red-sided opossum, Monodelphis brevicaudata LR/lc
    - Genus: Philander
      - Gray four-eyed opossum, Philander opossum LR/lc

== See also ==
- List of chordate orders
- Lists of mammals by region
- List of prehistoric mammals
- Mammal classification
- List of mammals described in the 2000s
