= Oecomys rutilus =

Conservation status
- Least Concern (IUCN 3.1)

Scientific classification
- Kingdom: Animalia
- Phylum: Chordata
- Class: Mammalia
- Order: Rodentia
- Family: Cricetidae
- Subfamily: Sigmodontinae
- Genus: Oecomys
- Species: O. rutilus

Binomial name
- Oecomys rutilus Anthony, 1921

Species of rodent

Oecomys rutilus, also known as the reddish oecomys or red arboreal rice rat, is a species of rodent in the genus Oecomys of family Cricetidae. It is found in Guyana, Suriname, French Guiana, and nearby regions of Brazil and Venezuela.
