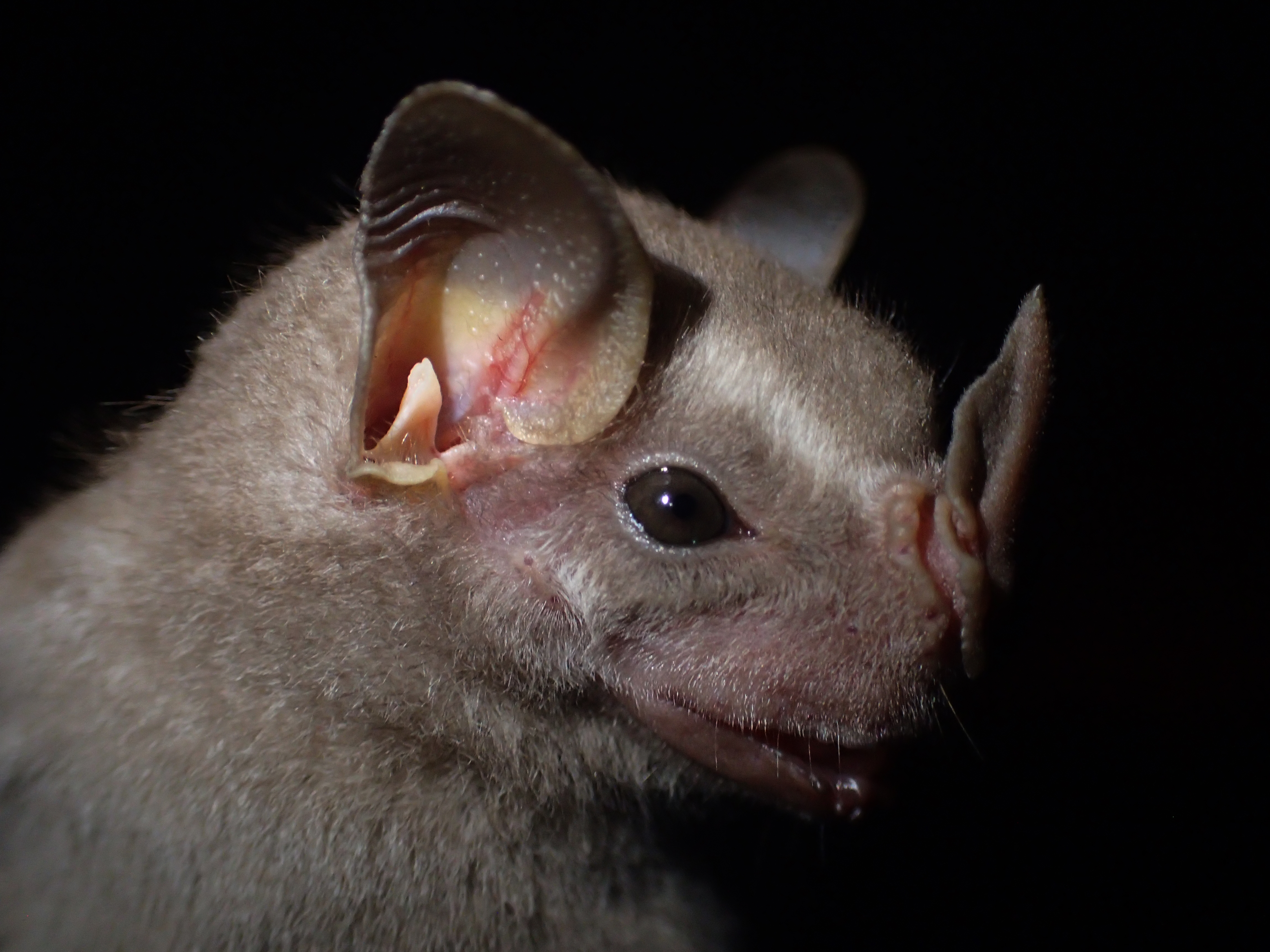

Conservation status
- Least Concern (IUCN 3.1)

Scientific classification
- Kingdom: Animalia
- Phylum: Chordata
- Class: Mammalia
- Order: Chiroptera
- Family: Phyllostomidae
- Genus: Uroderma
- Species: U. magnirostrum

Binomial name
- Uroderma magnirostrum Davis, 1968

= Brown tent-making bat =

Species of bat

The brown tent-making bat (Uroderma magnirostrum) is a species of bat found in South and Central America.

== Description ==
Members of this species are 54 to 70 mm (2.1 to 2.8 in) long, have no tails and weigh between 12 and 21 g (0.42 and 0.74 oz). Their forearms reach lengths between 41 and 45 mm (1.6 and 1.8 in), the hindfeet are 9 to 12 mm (0.35 to 0.47 in) long, and the length of the ears is between 13 and 17 mm (0.51 and 0.67 in). A faint white dorsal stripe is visible on the top of the head. The bottom half of the head is covered by taupe fur, while the bottom of the nose-leaf and the ears may be brighter. A white strip is visible above the eyes, and an additional faint white stripe is sometimes visible below the eyes. In flight, the uropatagium is U-shaped.

== Geographic distribution ==
The range of the brown tent-making bat includes a broad strip of the Pacific coast of North America, ranging from the Mexican state of Michoacán in the west to Nicaragua in the east. A second population occupies a region between central Panama and Rio de Janeiro, whose western border reaches the Andes in Ecuador, Peru and Bolivia. The brown tent-making bat lives in flatlands and in heights of up to 1000 meters. Habitats include evergreen forests, drier tropical forests and plantations.

== Behavior ==
The species is named after its behavior of biting into the midribs or veins of large leaves such as banana leaves so that they fold to create tent-like nests. Since individuals have been found dusted in pollen, it is presumed that their diet includes nectar or flower parts. The species is also known to feed on fruits and insects.

== Conservation status ==
Due to stable populations and a lack of threats, the IUCN lists the conservation status of the species as least concern.
