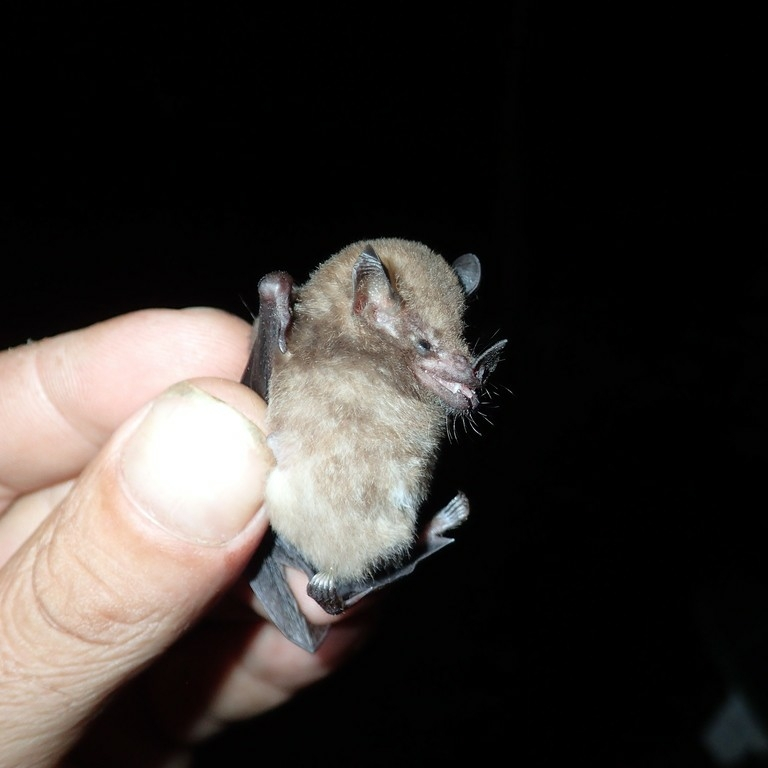
- Chestnut long-tongued bat

Conservation status
- Least Concern (IUCN 3.1)

Scientific classification
- Kingdom: Animalia
- Phylum: Chordata
- Class: Mammalia
- Order: Chiroptera
- Family: Phyllostomidae
- Subfamily: Lonchophyllinae
- Genus: Lionycteris; Thomas, 1913
- Species: L. spurrelli

Binomial name
- Lionycteris spurrelli Thomas, 1913

= Chestnut long-tongued bat =

Species of bat

The chestnut long-tongued bat (Lionycteris spurrelli) is a bat species from South and Central America. It is the only species within its genus.
