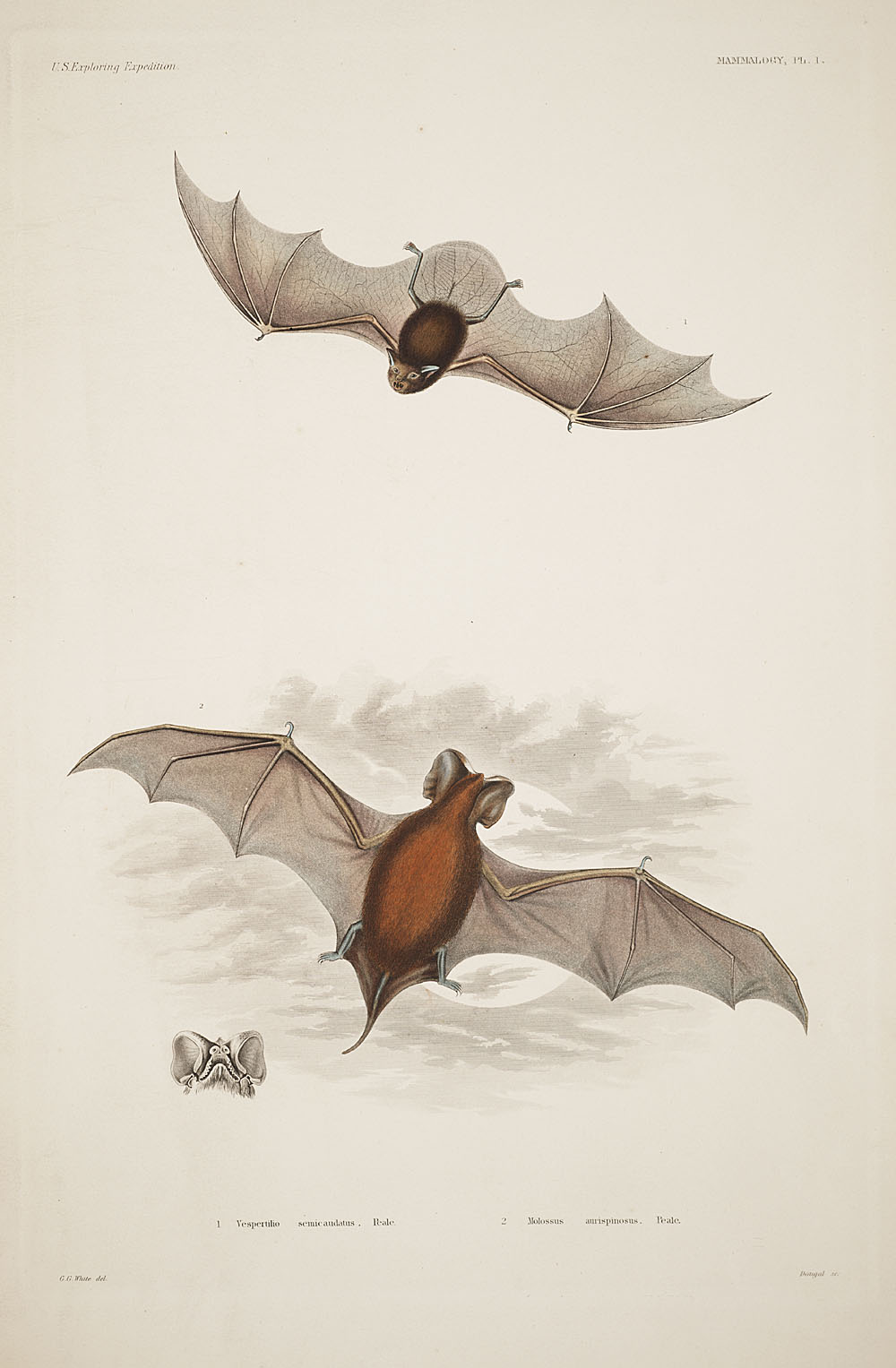
- Pacific sheath-tailed bat (top) and Peale's free-tailed bat (bottom)

Conservation status
- Least Concern (IUCN 3.1)

Scientific classification
- Kingdom: Animalia
- Phylum: Chordata
- Class: Mammalia
- Infraclass: Placentalia
- Order: Chiroptera
- Family: Molossidae
- Genus: Nyctinomops
- Species: N. aurispinosus

Binomial name
- Nyctinomops aurispinosus Peale, 1848

= Peale's free-tailed bat =

Species of bat

Peale's free-tailed bat (Nyctinomops aurispinosus) is a bat species from South and Central America.
