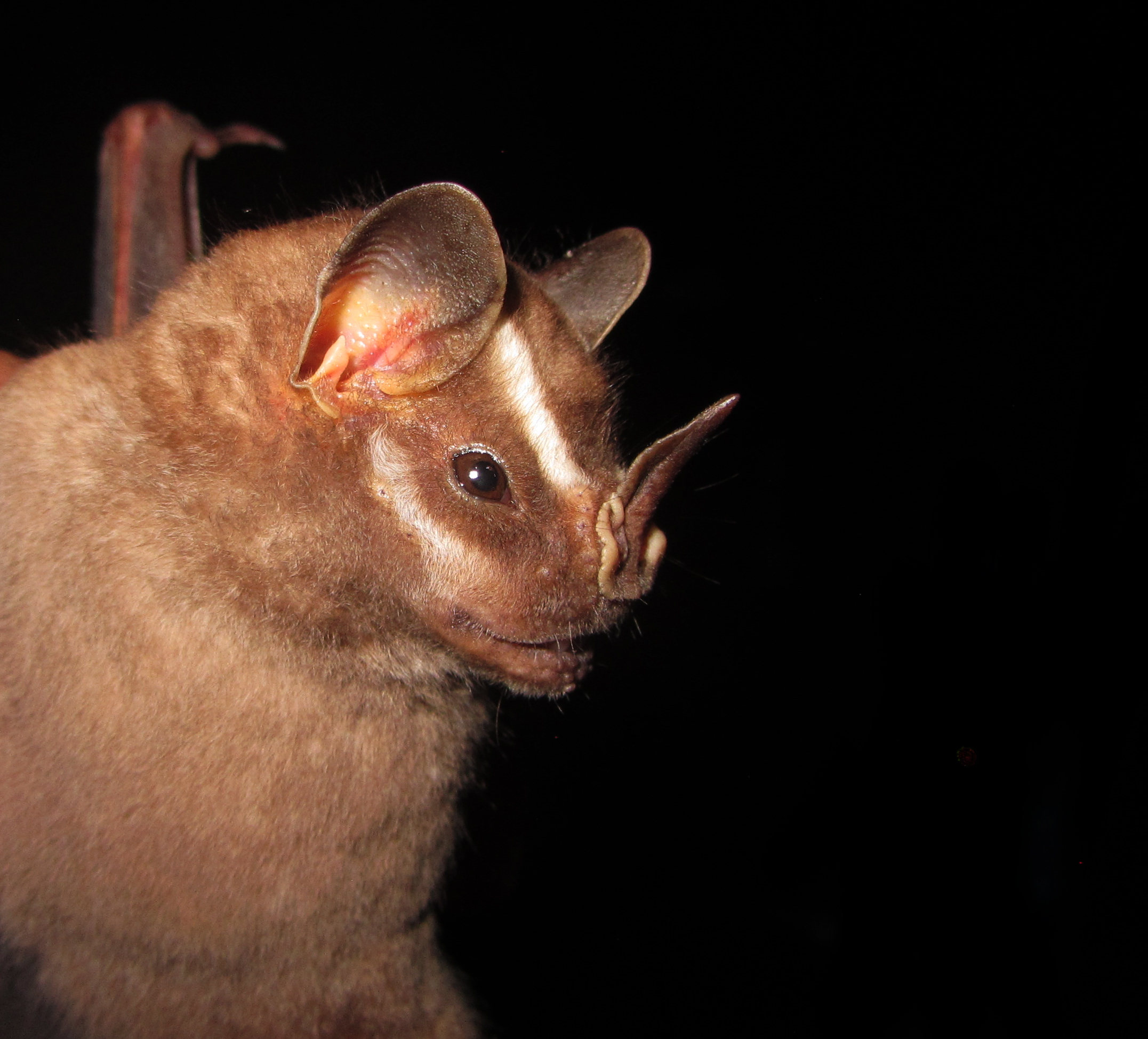

Conservation status
- Least Concern (IUCN 3.1)

Scientific classification
- Kingdom: Animalia
- Phylum: Chordata
- Class: Mammalia
- Order: Chiroptera
- Family: Phyllostomidae
- Genus: Vampyrodes; Thomas, 1900
- Species: V. caraccioli

Binomial name
- Vampyrodes caraccioli Thomas, 1889
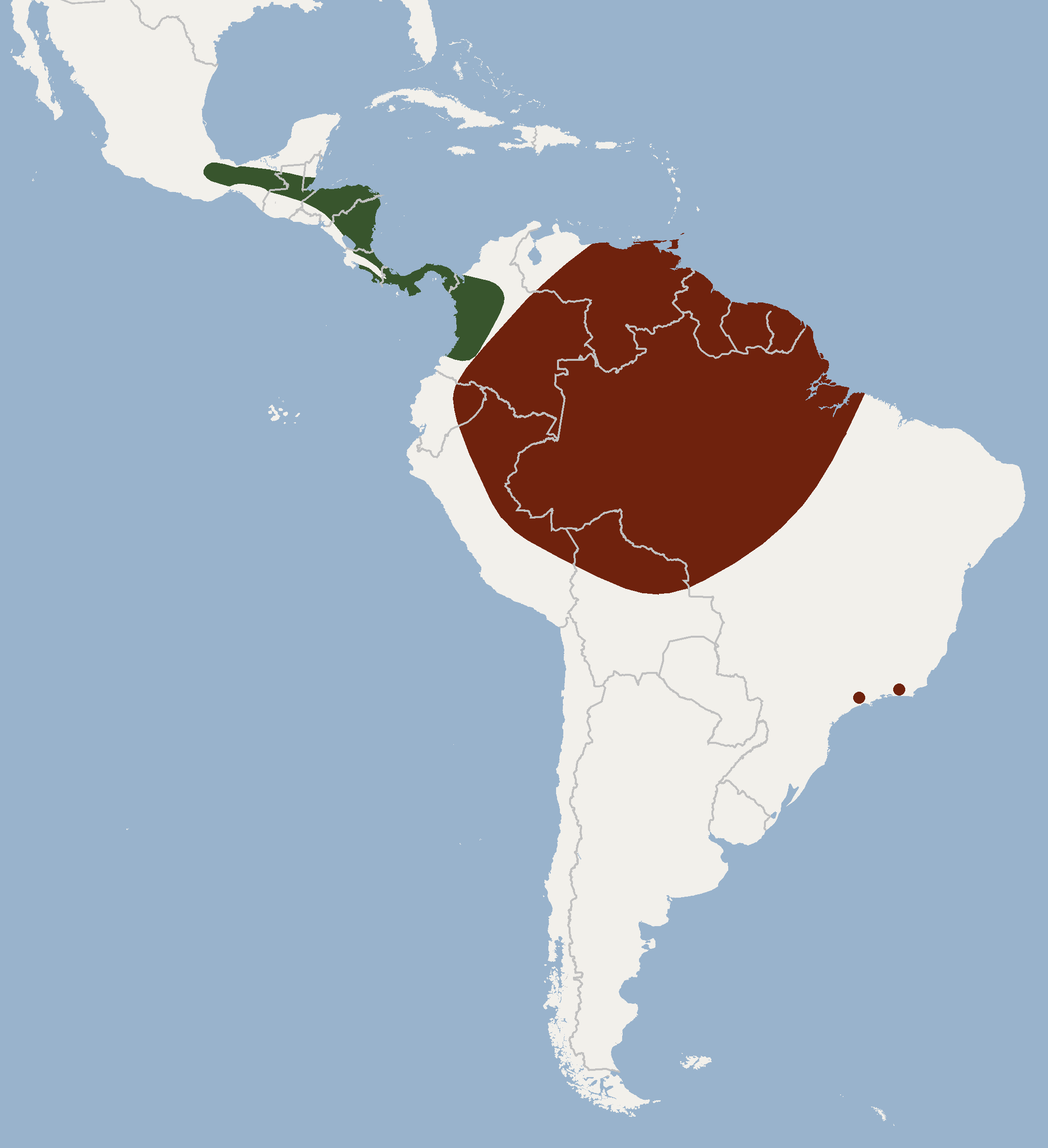

= Great stripe-faced bat =

Species of bat

The great stripe-faced bat or stripe-faced vampire bat (Vampyrodes caraccioli) is a bat species found from southern Mexico to Bolivia and northwestern Brazil, as well as on Trinidad. The great stripe-faced bat is a frugivore. It is one of two species within the genus Vampyrodes (Lesser vampire bat) the other being Vampyrodes major.

== Taxonomy ==
The Great stripe-faced bat is member of the subfamily Stenodermatinae in the larger family of Phyllostomidae. There are two species that are currently recognized within the genus of Vampyrodes and those are Vampyrodes caraccioli as well as Vampyrodes major. The classification of the great stripe-faced bat has been controversial for many years, originally thought to be monotypic Vampyrodes major was first classified as a subspecies of Vampyrodes caraccioli but is now recognized as its own species due to recent morphological and molecular analysis of the two species.

== Description ==
The Great stripe-faced bat is a medium to large sized frugivorous bat weighing on average between 25.2–34 g (0.89–1.20 oz) for a fully grown adult, and having an average forearm length of between 46.8–57.3 mm (1.84–2.26 in) respectively. The great stripe-faced bat is also characterized by the bright white stripes that streak the sides of the bat's face as well as the white mid dorsal stripe that extends from its crown to its rump. Great stripe-faced bats also have a distinguishing noseleaf which is highly developed and is longer than it is wide.

== Behaviour and feeding ==
Being nocturnal frugivores, great stripe-faced bats roost during the day and begin foraging for fruit (mainly bananas) and pollen to consume in the night. Great stripe-faced bats will rarely rest in the same roost on consecutive days and the females have been observed roosting in groups as large as 4 members while males roost on their own during the day. Great stripe-faced bats tend to create their day roosts in palm fronds, branches and foliage. Much like other members of the subfamily of Stenodermatinae the great stripe-faced bat has a litter size of one and practices seasonal polyestry.

== Distribution and habitat ==
The distribution of the great stripe-faced bat is vast due to the species’ ability to adapt to a wide variety of different habitats, they can be found in a variety of different countries across Central and South America including eastern Colombia, eastern Ecuador, Peru, northern Bolivia, Venezuela, Trinidad and Tobago, French Guiana, Guyana, Suriname, and Brazil. While great stripe-faced bats are a species of least concern according to IUCN they are still elusive.

Great stripe-faced bats are frugivorous bats that have been known to feed from a variety of different fruiting plants, but mainly specialize in consuming figs. Great stripe-faced bats will select an appropriate fruit from a tree and transport it to a feeding roost, which differs from the roosts where they rest during the day, and which will typically be less than 100 meters away from the fruiting tree.

== Predation ==
Great stripe-faced bats are predated on by visual predators that employ sit and wait ambush tactics such as owls and opossums. Great stripe-faced bats have been observed staying in their day roosts on nights in which they would typically feed in response to clear moonlit nights, as this makes them more vulnerable to predation.

== Status and conservation ==
According to the IUCN, the great striped-faced bat is considered a species of least concern due to the fact that this bat species is very tolerant of a large variety of different habitats, and is widely dispersed across Central and South America. Also, while the population of these bats may be declining, it is likely not at a rate that would include it in the threatened category. While the great stripe-faced bat is a very adaptable species, it becomes less common at lower latitudes. Local governments should prioritize the preservation of the southernmost populations of the great stripe-faced bat.
