= List of mammals of French Guiana =

This is a list of the mammal species recorded in French Guiana. There are 176 mammal species in French Guiana, of which one is critically endangered, two are endangered, six are vulnerable, and four are near threatened.

The following tags are used to highlight each species' conservation status as assessed by the International Union for Conservation of Nature:

EX	Extinct	No reasonable doubt that the last individual has died.
EW	Extinct in the wild	Known only to survive in captivity or as a naturalized populations well outside its previous range.
CR	Critically endangered	The species is in imminent risk of extinction in the wild.
EN	Endangered	The species is facing an extremely high risk of extinction in the wild.
VU	Vulnerable	The species is facing a high risk of extinction in the wild.
NT	Near threatened	The species does not meet any of the criteria that would categorise it as risking extinction but it is likely to do so in the future.
LC	Least concern	There are no current identifiable risks to the species.
DD	Data deficient	There is inadequate information to make an assessment of the risks to this species.

Some species were assessed using an earlier set of criteria. Species assessed using this system have the following instead of near threatened and least concern categories:

LR/cd	Lower risk/conservation dependent	Species which were the focus of conservation programmes and may have moved into a higher risk category if that programme was discontinued.
LR/nt	Lower risk/near threatened	Species which are close to being classified as vulnerable but are not the subject of conservation programmes.
LR/lc	Lower risk/least concern	Species for which there are no identifiable risks.

== Subclass: Theria ==
=== Infraclass: Eutheria ===
==== Order: Sirenia (manatees and dugongs) ====
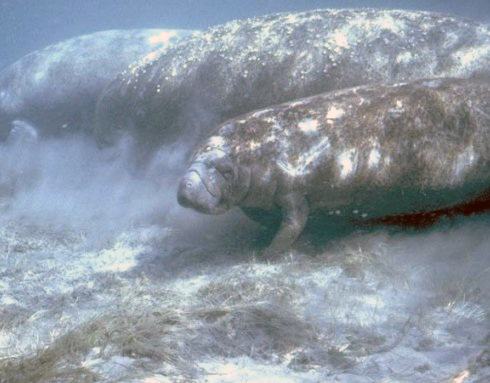
West Indian manatees

Sirenia is an order of fully aquatic, herbivorous mammals that inhabit rivers, estuaries, coastal marine waters, swamps, and marine wetlands. All four species are endangered.

- Family: Trichechidae
  - Genus: Trichechus
    - West Indian manatee, T. manatus VU

==== Order: Cingulata (armadillos) ====
The armadillos are small mammals with a bony armored shell. They are native to the Americas. There are around 20 extant species.

- Family: Dasypodidae (armadillos)
  - Subfamily: Dasypodinae
    - Genus: Dasypus
      - Greater long-nosed armadillo, Dasypus kappleri LC
      - Nine-banded armadillo, Dasypus novemcinctus LC
  - Subfamily: Tolypeutinae
    - Genus: Cabassous
      - Southern naked-tailed armadillo, Cabassous unicinctus LC
    - Genus: Priodontes
      - Giant armadillo, Priodontes maximus VU

==== Order: Pilosa (anteaters, sloths and tamanduas) ====
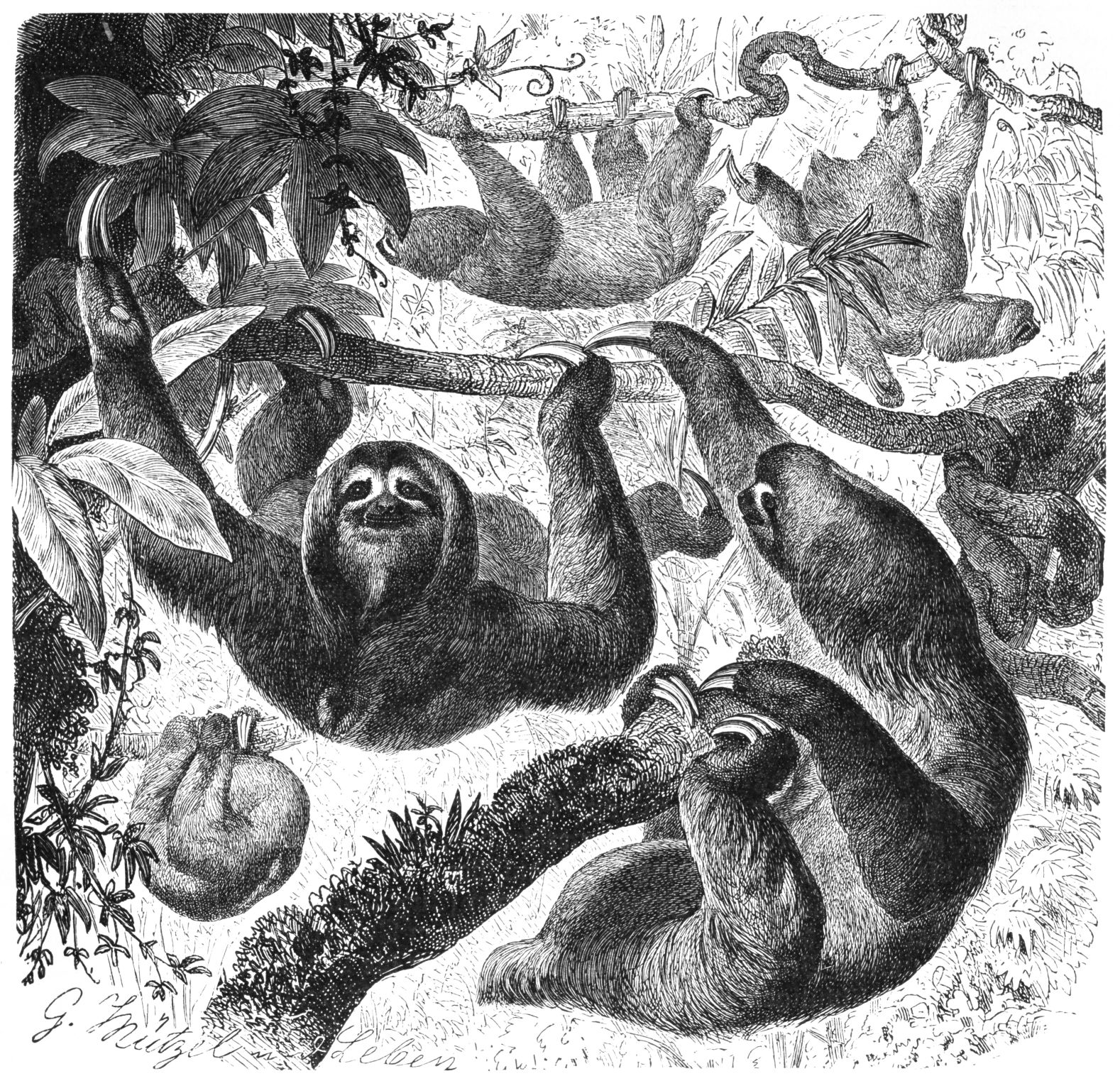
Pale-throated three-toed sloth

The order Pilosa is extant only in the Americas and includes the anteaters, sloths, and tamanduas.

- Suborder: Folivora
  - Family: Bradypodidae (three-toed sloths)
    - Genus: Bradypus
      - Pale-throated three-toed sloth, Bradypus tridactylus LC
  - Family: Choloepodidae (two-toed sloths)
    - Genus: Choloepus
      - Linnaeus's two-toed sloth, Choloepus didactylus LC
- Suborder: Vermilingua
  - Family: Cyclopedidae
    - Genus: Cyclopes
      - Silky anteater, Cyclopes didactylus LC
  - Family: Myrmecophagidae (American anteaters)
    - Genus: Myrmecophaga silky anteater
      - Giant anteater, Myrmecophaga tridactyla NT
    - Genus: Tamandua silky anteater
      - Southern tamandua, Tamandua tetradactyla LC

==== Order: Primates ====
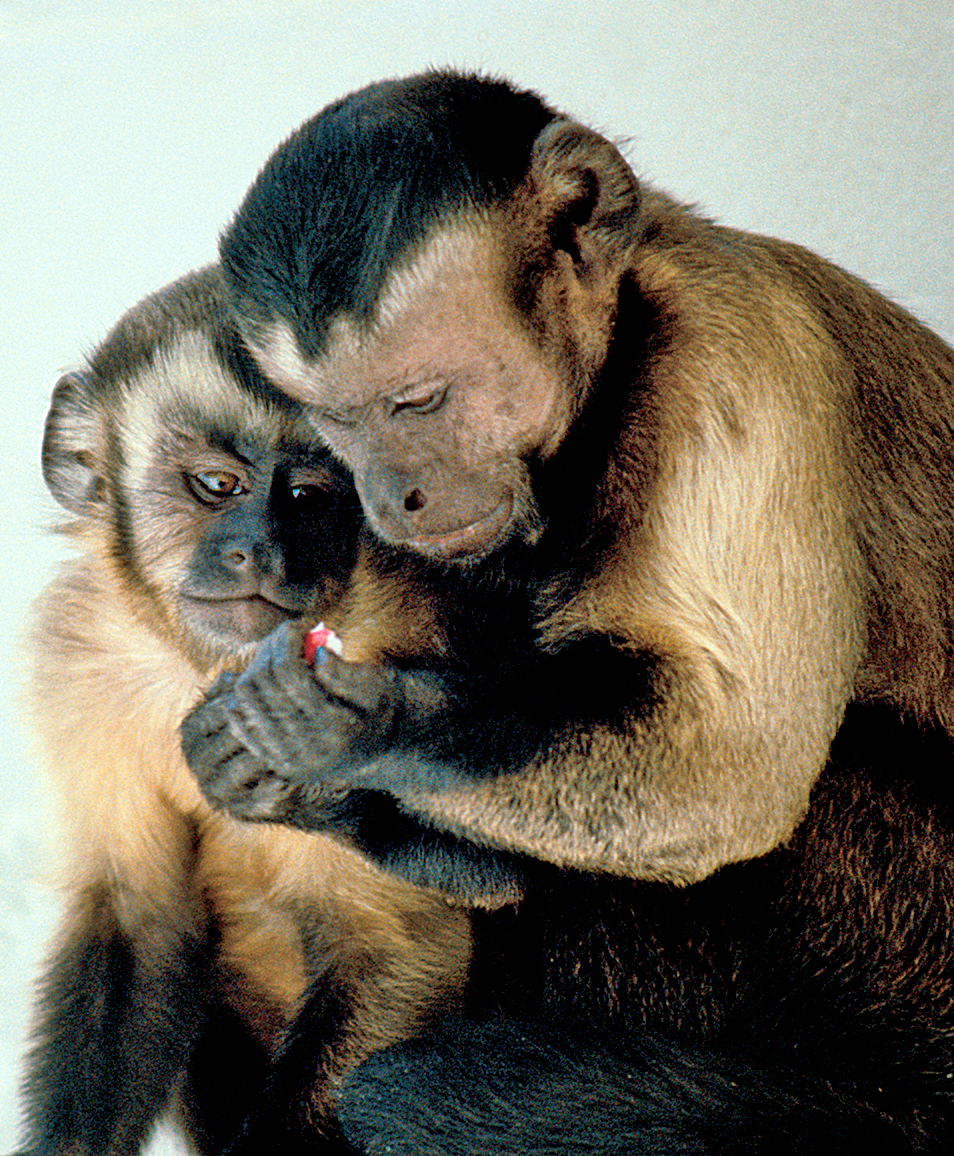
Tufted capuchin

The order Primates contains humans and their closest relatives: lemurs, lorisoids, monkeys, and apes.

- Suborder: Haplorhini
  - Infraorder: Simiiformes
    - Parvorder: Platyrrhini (New World monkeys)
      - Family: Cebidae
        - Subfamily: Callitrichinae
          - Genus: Saguinus
            - Red-handed tamarin, Saguinus midas LC
        - Subfamily: Cebinae
          - Genus: Cebus
            - Tufted capuchin, Cebus apella LC
            - Weeper capuchin, Cebus olivaceus LC
          - Genus: Saimiri
            - Common squirrel monkey, Saimiri sciureus LC
      - Family: Pitheciidae
        - Subfamily: Pitheciinae
          - Genus: Pithecia
            - White-faced saki, Pithecia pithecia LC
          - Genus: Chiropotes
            - Red-backed bearded saki, Chiropotes chiropotes LC
      - Family: Atelidae
        - Subfamily: Atelinae
          - Genus: Ateles
            - Red-faced spider monkey, Ateles paniscus LC
        - Subfamily: Alouattinae
          - Genus: Alouatta
            - Guyanan red howler, Alouatta macconnelli LC

==== Order: Rodentia (rodents) ====
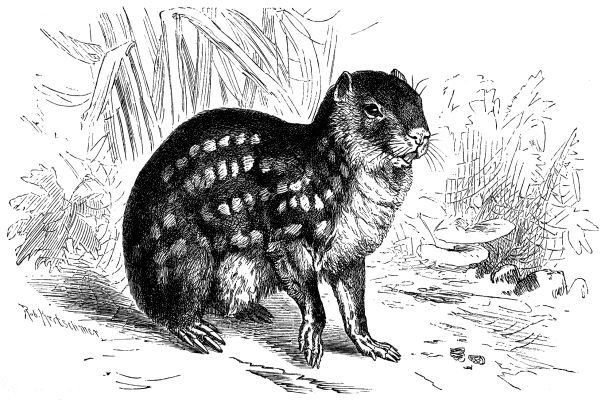
Lowland paca

Rodents make up the largest order of mammals, with over 40% of mammalian species. They have two incisors in the upper and lower jaw which grow continually and must be kept short by gnawing. Most rodents are small though the capybara can weigh up to 45 kg (99 lb).

- Suborder: Hystricognathi
  - Family: Erethizontidae (New World porcupines)
    - Subfamily: Erethizontinae
      - Genus: Coendou
        - Brazilian porcupine, Coendou prehensilis LR/lc
  - Family: Caviidae (guinea pigs)
    - Subfamily: Caviinae
      - Genus: Cavia
        - Brazilian guinea pig, Cavia aperea LR/lc
    - Subfamily: Hydrochoerinae (capybaras and rock cavies)
      - Genus: Hydrochoerus
        - Capybara, Hydrochoerus hydrochaeris LR/lc
  - Family: Dasyproctidae (agoutis and pacas)
    - Genus: Dasyprocta
      - Red-rumped agouti, Dasyprocta leporina LR/lc
    - Genus: Myoprocta
      - Red acouchi, Myoprocta acouchy LR/lc
      - Red acouchi, Myoprocta exilis DD
  - Family: Cuniculidae
    - Genus: Cuniculus
      - Lowland paca, Cuniculus paca LC
  - Family: Echimyidae
    - Subfamily: Echimyinae
      - Genus: Isothrix
        - Sinnamary brush-tailed rat, Isothrix sinnamariensis DD
      - Genus: Makalata
        - Brazilian spiny tree-rat, Makalata didelphoides LR/lc
    - Subfamily: Eumysopinae
      - Genus: Mesomys
        - Ferreira's spiny tree rat, Mesomys hispidus LR/lc
      - Genus: Proechimys
        - Guyenne spiny rat, Proechimys guyannensis LR/lc
        - Cuvier's spiny rat, Proechimys cuvieri LR/lc
- Suborder: Sciurognathi
  - Family: Sciuridae (squirrels)
    - Subfamily: Sciurillinae
      - Genus: Sciurillus
        - Neotropical pygmy squirrel, Sciurillus pusillus LR/lc
    - Subfamily: Sciurinae
      - Tribe: Sciurini
        - Genus: Sciurus
          - Brazilian squirrel, Sciurus aestuans LR/lc
  - Family: Cricetidae
    - Subfamily: Sigmodontinae
      - Genus: Holochilus
        - Amazonian marsh rat, Holochilus sciureus LR/lc
      - Genus: Neacomys
        - Guiana bristly mouse, Neacomys guianae LR/lc
        - Common bristly mouse, Neacomys spinosus LR/lc
      - Genus: Nectomys
        - Small-footed bristly mouse, Nectomys parvipes CR
        - Scaly-footed water rat, Nectomys squamipes LR/lc
      - Genus: Neusticomys
        - Oyapock's fish-eating rat, Neusticomys oyapocki EN
      - Genus: Oecomys
        - Bicolored arboreal rice rat, Oecomys bicolor LR/lc
        - Brazilian arboreal rice rat, Oecomys paricola LR/lc
        - King arboreal rice rat, Oecomys rex LR/lc
        - Robert's arboreal rice rat, Oecomys roberti LR/lc
        - Red arboreal rice rat, Oecomys rutilus LR/lc
        - Trinidad arboreal rice rat, Oecomys trinitatis LR/lc
      - Genus: Oligoryzomys
        - Fulvous pygmy rice rat, Oligoryzomys fulvescens LR/lc
      - Genus: Oryzomys
        - MacConnell's rice rat, Oryzomys macconnelli LR/lc
        - Azara's broad-headed rice rat, Oryzomys megacephalus LR/lc
        - Yungas rice rat, Oryzomys yunganus LR/lc
      - Genus: Rhipidomys
        - White-footed climbing mouse, Rhipidomys leucodactylus LR/lc
        - Splendid climbing mouse, Rhipidomys nitela LR/lc
      - Genus: Zygodontomys
        - Short-tailed cane rat, Zygodontomys brevicauda LR/lc

==== Order: Lagomorpha (lagomorphs) ====
The lagomorphs comprise two families, Leporidae (hares and rabbits), and Ochotonidae (pikas). Though they can resemble rodents, and were classified as a superfamily in that order until the early 20th century, they have since been considered a separate order. They differ from rodents in a number of physical characteristics, such as having four incisors in the upper jaw rather than two.

- Family: Leporidae (rabbits, hares)
  - Genus: Sylvilagus
    - Tapeti, Sylvilagus brasiliensis LR/lc

==== Order: Chiroptera (bats) ====
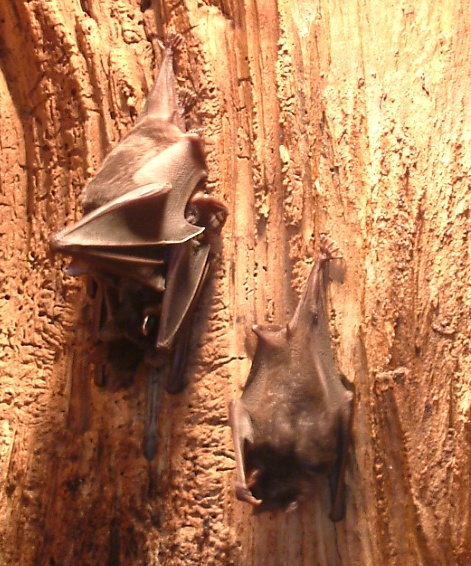
Pale spear-nosed bat

The bats' most distinguishing feature is that their forelimbs are developed as wings, making them the only mammals capable of flight. Bat species account for about 20% of all mammals.

- Family: Noctilionidae
  - Genus: Noctilio
    - Lesser bulldog bat, Noctilio albiventris LR/lc
    - Greater bulldog bat, Noctilio leporinus LR/lc
- Family: Vespertilionidae
  - Subfamily: Myotinae
    - Genus: Myotis
      - Silver-tipped myotis, Myotis albescens LR/lc
      - Black myotis, Myotis nigricans LR/lc
      - Riparian myotis, Myotis riparius LR/lc
  - Subfamily: Vespertilioninae
    - Genus: Eptesicus
      - Brazilian brown bat, Eptesicus brasiliensis LR/lc
      - Argentine brown bat, Eptesicus furinalis LR/lc
    - Genus: Lasiurus
      - Desert red bat, Lasiurus blossevillii LR/lc
      - Tacarcuna bat, Lasiurus castaneus VU
      - Southern yellow bat, Lasiurus ega LR/lc
      - Big red bat, Lasiurus egregius LR/nt
- Family: Molossidae
  - Genus: Cynomops
    - Greenhall's dog-faced bat, Cynomops greenhalli LR/lc
    - Southern dog-faced bat, Cynomops planirostris LR/lc
  - Genus: Eumops
    - Black bonneted bat, Eumops auripendulus LR/lc
    - Dwarf bonneted bat, Eumops bonariensis LR/lc
  - Genus: Molossus
    - Black mastiff bat, Molossus ater LR/lc
    - Velvety free-tailed bat, Molossus molossus LR/lc
  - Genus: Nyctinomops
    - Peale's free-tailed bat, Nyctinomops aurispinosus LR/lc
    - Broad-eared bat, Nyctinomops laticaudatus LR/lc
    - Big free-tailed bat, Nyctinomops macrotis LR/lc
  - Genus: Promops
    - Big crested mastiff bat, Promops centralis LR/lc
- Family: Emballonuridae
  - Genus: Centronycteris
    - Shaggy bat, Centronycteris maximiliani LR/lc
  - Genus: Cormura
    - Wagner's sac-winged bat, Cormura brevirostris LR/lc
  - Genus: Diclidurus
    - Northern ghost bat, Diclidurus albus LR/lc
  - Genus: Peropteryx
    - Greater dog-like bat, Peropteryx kappleri LR/lc
    - White-winged dog-like bat, Peropteryx leucoptera LR/lc
  - Genus: Rhynchonycteris
    - Proboscis bat, Rhynchonycteris naso LR/lc
  - Genus: Saccopteryx
    - Greater sac-winged bat, Saccopteryx bilineata LR/lc
    - Frosted sac-winged bat, Saccopteryx canescens LR/lc
    - Lesser sac-winged bat, Saccopteryx leptura LR/lc
- Family: Mormoopidae
  - Genus: Pteronotus
    - Naked-backed bat, Pteronotus davyi LR/lc
    - Parnell's mustached bat, Pteronotus parnellii LR/lc
- Family: Phyllostomidae
  - Subfamily: Phyllostominae
    - Genus: Glyphonycteris
      - Davies's big-eared bat, Glyphonycteris daviesi LR/nt
    - Genus: Lampronycteris
      - Yellow-throated big-eared bat, Lampronycteris brachyotis LR/lc
    - Genus: Lonchorhina
      - Tomes's sword-nosed bat, Lonchorhina aurita LR/lc
      - Northern sword-nosed bat, Lonchorhina inusitata DD
    - Genus: Lophostoma
      - Pygmy round-eared bat, Lophostoma brasiliense LR/lc
      - Schultz's round-eared bat, Lophostoma schulzi VU
      - White-throated round-eared bat, Lophostoma silvicolum LR/lc
    - Genus: Macrophyllum
      - Long-legged bat, Macrophyllum macrophyllum LR/lc
    - Genus: Micronycteris
      - Brosset's big-eared bat, Micronycteris brosseti DD
      - Hairy big-eared bat, Micronycteris hirsuta LR/lc
      - Little big-eared bat, Micronycteris megalotis LR/lc
      - White-bellied big-eared bat, Micronycteris minuta LR/lc
    - Genus: Mimon
      - Golden bat, Mimon bennettii LR/lc
      - Striped hairy-nosed bat, Mimon crenulatum LR/lc
    - Genus: Phylloderma
      - Pale-faced bat, Phylloderma stenops LR/lc
    - Genus: Phyllostomus
      - Pale spear-nosed bat, Phyllostomus discolor LR/lc
      - Greater spear-nosed bat, Phyllostomus hastatus LR/lc
      - Guianan spear-nosed bat, Phyllostomus latifolius LR/nt
    - Genus: Tonatia
      - Stripe-headed round-eared bat, Tonatia saurophila LR/lc
    - Genus: Trachops
      - Fringe-lipped bat, Trachops cirrhosus LR/lc
    - Genus: Trinycteris
      - Niceforo's big-eared bat, Trinycteris nicefori LR/lc
    - Genus: Vampyrum
      - Spectral bat, Vampyrum spectrum LR/nt
  - Subfamily: Lonchophyllinae
    - Genus: Lionycteris
      - Chestnut long-tongued bat, Lionycteris spurrelli LR/lc
    - Genus: Lonchophylla
      - Thomas's nectar bat, Lonchophylla thomasi LR/lc
  - Subfamily: Glossophaginae
    - Genus: Anoura
      - Tailed tailless bat, Anoura caudifer LR/lc
      - Geoffroy's tailless bat, Anoura geoffroyi LR/lc
    - Genus: Choeroniscus
      - Intermediate long-tailed bat, Choeroniscus intermedius LR/nt
      - Minor long-nosed long-tongued bat, Choeroniscus minor LR/lc
    - Genus: Glossophaga
      - Pallas's long-tongued bat, Glossophaga soricina LR/lc
  - Subfamily: Carolliinae
    - Genus: Carollia
      - Chestnut short-tailed bat, Carollia castanea LR/lc
      - Seba's short-tailed bat, Carollia perspicillata LR/lc
    - Genus: Rhinophylla
      - Dwarf little fruit bat, Rhinophylla pumilio LR/lc
  - Subfamily: Stenodermatinae
    - Genus: Ametrida
      - Little white-shouldered bat, Ametrida centurio LR/lc
    - Genus: Artibeus
      - Andersen's fruit-eating bat, Artibeus anderseni LR/lc
      - Gervais's fruit-eating bat, Artibeus cinereus LR/lc
      - Brown fruit-eating bat, Artibeus concolor LR/nt
      - Jamaican fruit bat, Artibeus jamaicensis LR/lc
      - Great fruit-eating bat, Artibeus lituratus LR/lc
      - Dark fruit-eating bat, Artibeus obscurus LR/nt
    - Genus: Chiroderma
      - Hairy big-eyed bat, Chiroderma villosum LR/lc
    - Genus: Mesophylla
      - MacConnell's bat, Mesophylla macconnelli LR/lc
    - Genus: Sturnira
      - Little yellow-shouldered bat, Sturnira lilium LR/lc
      - Tilda's yellow-shouldered bat, Sturnira tildae LR/lc
    - Genus: Uroderma
      - Tent-making bat, Uroderma bilobatum LR/lc
      - Brown tent-making bat, Uroderma magnirostrum LR/lc
    - Genus: Vampyressa
      - Melissa's yellow-eared bat, Vampyressa melissa LR/nt
      - Southern little yellow-eared bat, Vampyressa pusilla LR/lc
    - Genus: Vampyrodes
      - Great stripe-faced bat, Vampyrodes caraccioli LR/lc
    - Genus: Platyrrhinus
      - Short-headed broad-nosed bat, Platyrrhinus brachycephalus LR/lc
      - Heller's broad-nosed bat, Platyrrhinus helleri LR/lc
  - Subfamily: Desmodontinae
    - Genus: Desmodus
      - Common vampire bat, Desmodus rotundus LR/lc
- Family: Furipteridae
  - Genus: Furipterus
    - Thumbless bat, Furipterus horrens LR/lc
- Family: Thyropteridae
  - Genus: Thyroptera
    - Peters's disk-winged bat, Thyroptera discifera LR/lc
    - Spix's disk-winged bat, Thyroptera tricolor LR/lc

==== Order: Cetacea (whales) ====
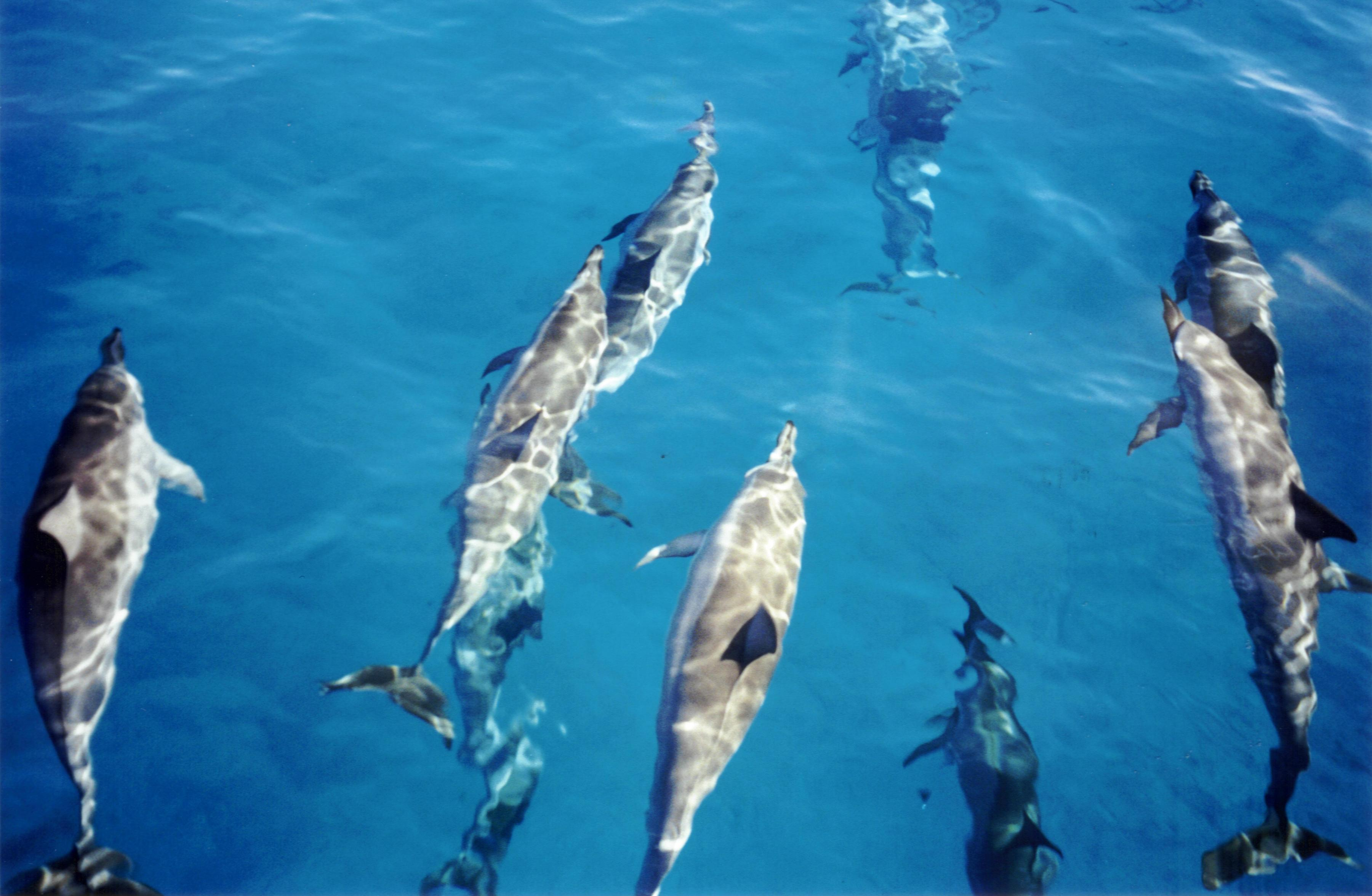
Spinner dolphins

The order Cetacea includes whales, dolphins and porpoises. They are the mammals most fully adapted to aquatic life with a spindle-shaped nearly hairless body, protected by a thick layer of blubber, and forelimbs and tail modified to provide propulsion underwater.

- Suborder: Mysticeti
  - Family: Balaenopteridae
    - Genus: Balaenoptera
      - Common minke whale, Balaenoptera acutorostrata
      - Sei whale, Balaenoptera borealis
      - Bryde's whale, Balaenoptera brydei
      - Blue whale, Balaenoptera musculus
      - Fin whale, Balaenoptera physalus
    - Genus: Megaptera
      - Humpback whale, Megaptera novaeangliae
- Suborder: Odontoceti
  - Superfamily: Platanistoidea
    - Family: Delphinidae (marine dolphins)
      - Genus: Steno
        - Rough-toothed dolphin, Steno bredanensis DD
      - Genus: Sotalia
        - Costero, Sotalia guianensis DD
      - Genus: Stenella
        - Pantropical spotted dolphin, Stenella attenuata DD
        - Clymene dolphin, Stenella clymene DD
        - Striped dolphin, Stenella coeruleoalba DD
        - Atlantic spotted dolphin, Stenella frontalis DD
        - Spinner dolphin, Stenella longirostris LR/cd
      - Genus: Tursiops
        - Common bottlenose dolphin, Tursiops truncatus LR/cd
      - Genus: Delphinus
        - Long-beaked common dolphin, Delphinus capensis LR/lc
      - Genus: Lagenodelphis
        - Fraser's dolphin, Lagenodelphis hosei DD
      - Genus: Feresa
        - Pygmy killer whale, Feresa attenuata DD
      - Genus: Orcinus
        - Killer whale, Orcinus orca DD
      - Genus: Peponocephala
        - Melon-headed whale, Peponocephala electra DD
    - Family: Physeteridae (sperm whales)
      - Genus: Physeter
        - Sperm whale, Physeter macrocephalus VU
    - Family: Kogiidae (small sperm whales)
      - Genus: Kogia
        - Pygmy sperm whale, Kogia breviceps DD
        - Dwarf sperm whale, Kogia sima DD
- Superfamily Ziphioidea
  - Family: Ziphidae (beaked whales)
    - Genus: Mesoplodon
      - Blainville's beaked whale, Mesoplodon densirostris DD
      - Gervais' beaked whale, Mesoplodon europaeus DD
    - Genus: Ziphius
      - Cuvier's beaked whale, Ziphius cavirostris DD

==== Order: Carnivora (carnivorans) ====
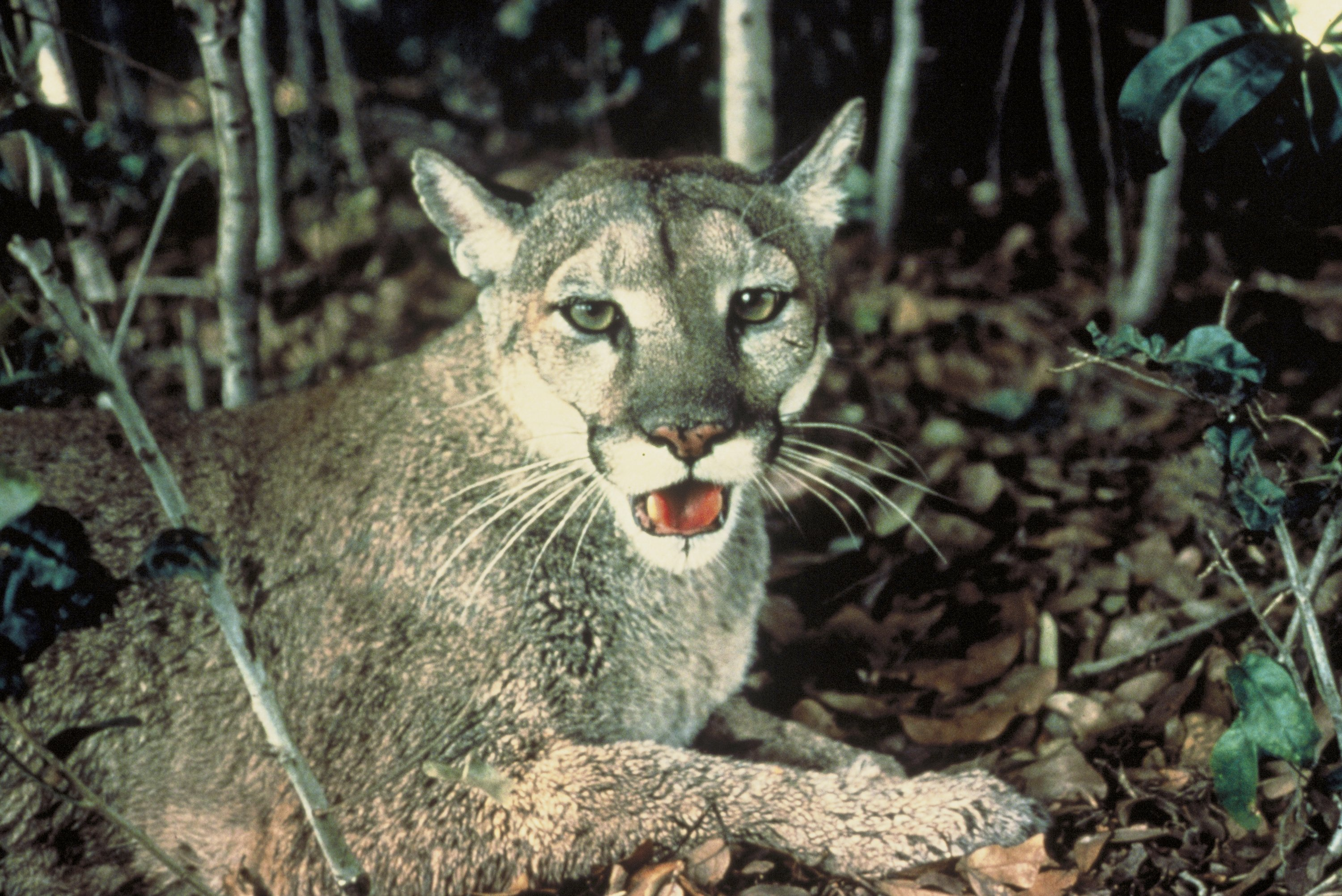
Cougar

There are over 260 species of carnivorans, the majority of which feed primarily on meat. They have a characteristic skull shape and dentition.

- Suborder: Feliformia
  - Family: Felidae (cats)
    - Subfamily: Felinae
      - Genus: Leopardus
        - Ocelot L. pardalis LC
        - Oncilla L. tigrinus VU
        - Margay L. wiedii NT
      - Genus: Herpailurus
        - Jaguarundi, H. yagouaroundi LC
      - Genus: Puma
        - Cougar, P. concolor LC
    - Subfamily: Pantherinae
      - Genus: Panthera
        - Jaguar, P. onca NT
  - Family: Herpestidae
    - Genus: Urva
      - Small Indian mongoose, U. auropunctata LC introduced
- Suborder: Caniformia
  - Family: Canidae (dogs, foxes)
    - Genus: Cerdocyon
      - Crab-eating fox, Cerdocyon thous LC
    - Genus: Speothos
      - Bush dog, Speothos venaticus VU
  - Family: Procyonidae (raccoons)
    - Genus: Procyon
      - Crab-eating raccoon, Procyon cancrivorus
    - Genus: Nasua
      - South American coati, Nasua nasua
    - Genus: Potos
      - Kinkajou, Potos flavus
  - Family: Mustelidae (mustelids)
    - Genus: Eira
      - Tayra, Eira barbara - fully protected species in Guyana
    - Genus: Galictis
      - Greater grison, Galictis vittata
    - Genus: Lontra
      - Neotropical river otter, Lontra longicaudis DD
    - Genus: Pteronura
      - Giant otter, Pteronura brasiliensis EN
  - Family: Mephitidae
    - Genus: Conepatus
      - Striped hog-nosed skunk, Conepatus semistriatus

==== Order: Perissodactyla (odd-toed ungulates) ====
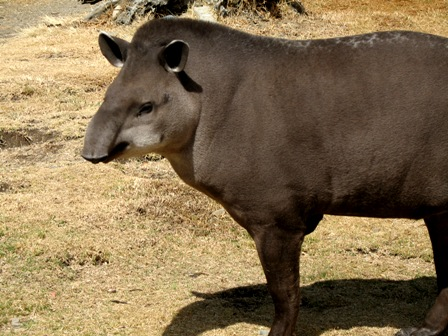
Brazilian tapir

The odd-toed ungulates are browsing and grazing mammals. They are usually large to very large, and have relatively simple stomachs and a large middle toe.

- Family: Tapiridae (tapirs)
  - Genus: Tapirus
    - Brazilian tapir, Tapirus terrestris VU

==== Order: Artiodactyla (even-toed ungulates) ====
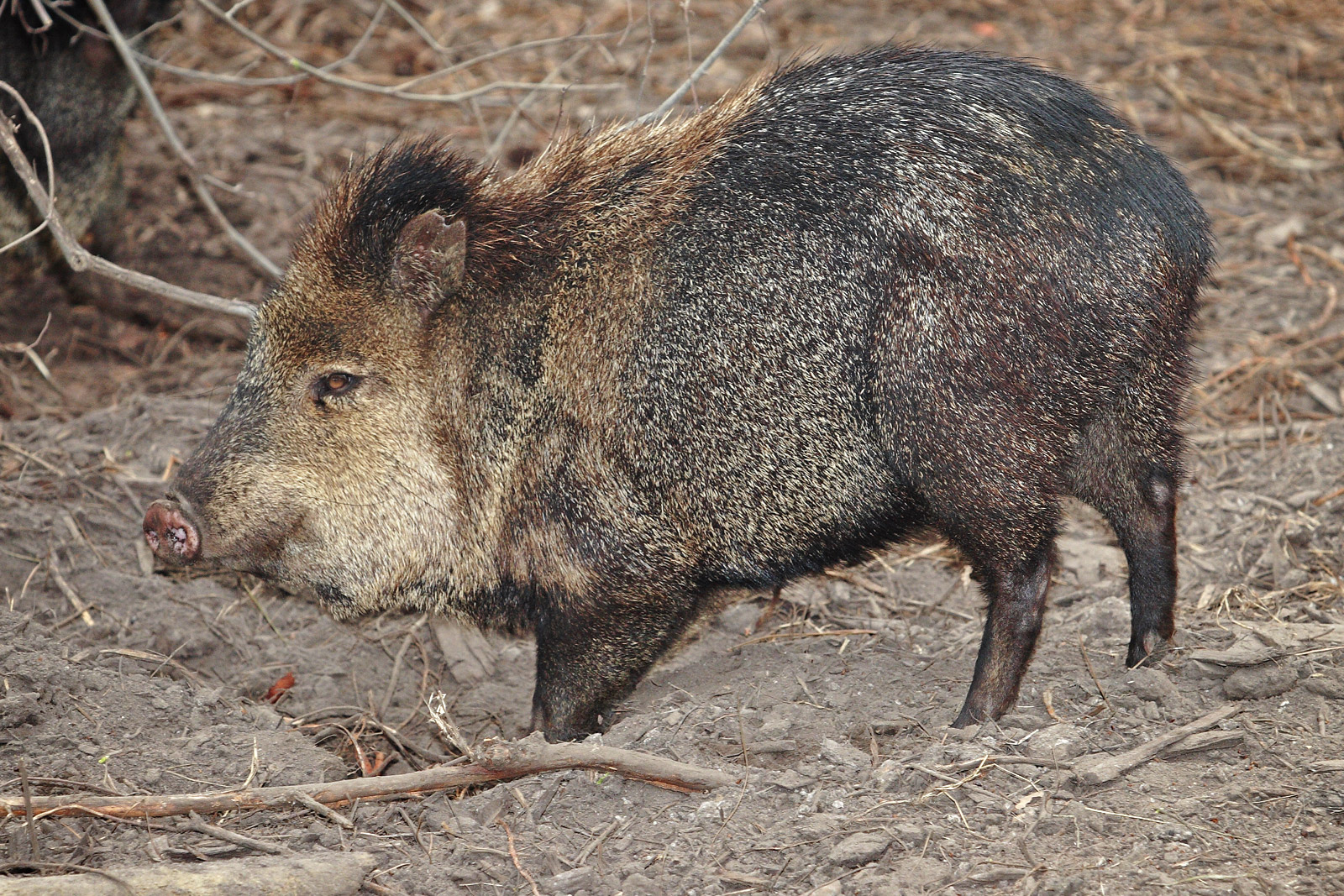
Collared peccary

The even-toed ungulates are ungulates whose weight is borne about equally by the third and fourth toes, rather than mostly or entirely by the third as in perissodactyls. There are about 220 artiodactyl species, including many that are of great economic importance to humans.

- Family: Tayassuidae (peccaries)
  - Genus: Dicotyles
    - Collared peccary, Dicotyles tajacu LC
  - Genus: Tayassu
    - White-lipped peccary, Tayassu pecari NT
- Family: Cervidae (deer)
  - Subfamily: Capreolinae
    - Genus: Mazama
      - Red brocket, Mazama americana DD
      - Gray brocket, Mazama gouazoupira DD
    - Genus: Odocoileus
      - White-tailed deer, Odocoileus virginianus LR/lc

=== Infraclass: Metatheria ===
==== Order: Didelphimorphia (common opossums) ====
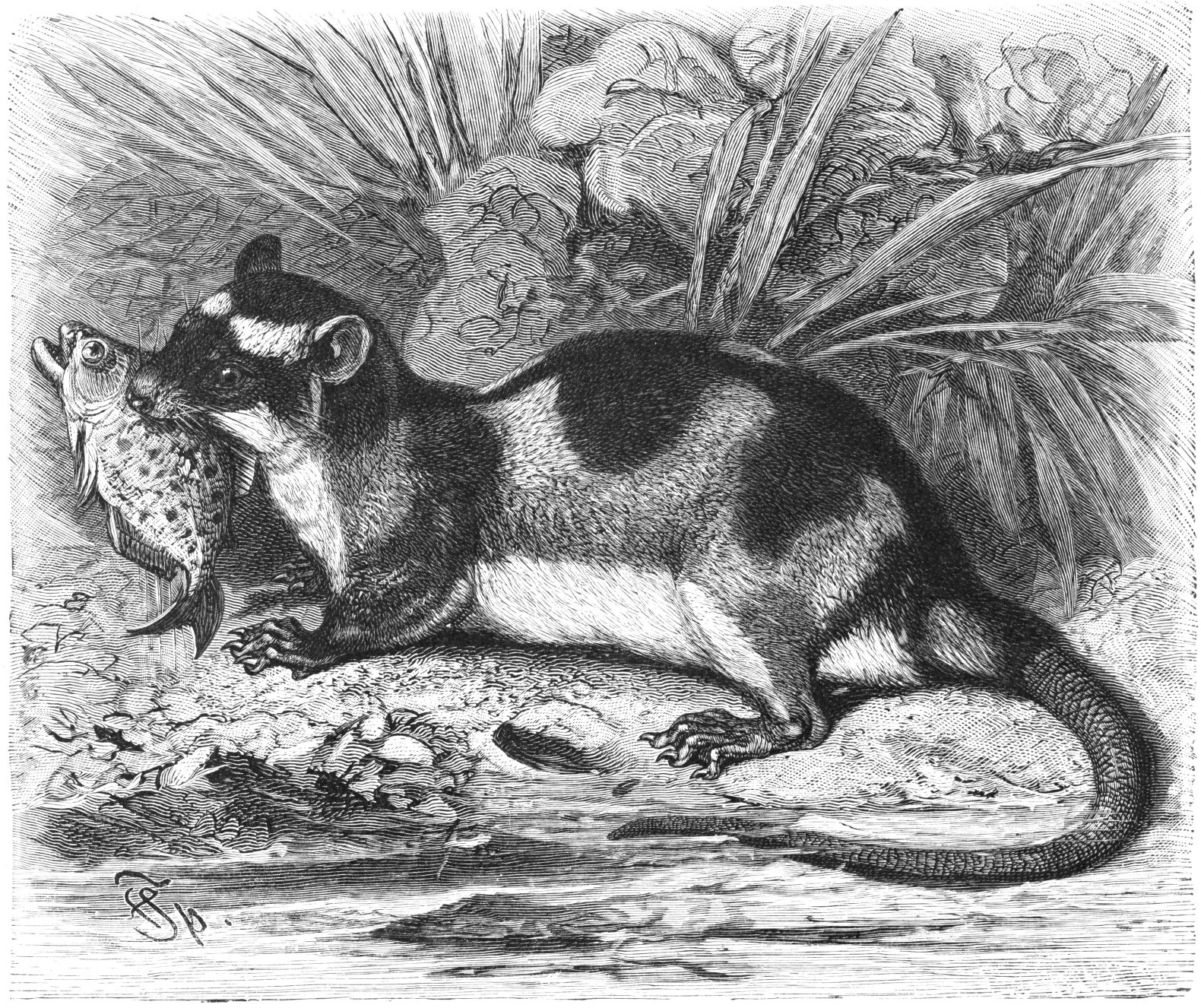
Water opossum

Didelphimorphia is the order of common opossums of the Western Hemisphere. Opossums probably diverged from the basic South American marsupials in the late Cretaceous or early Paleocene. They are small to medium-sized marsupials, about the size of a large house cat, with a long snout and prehensile tail.

- Family: Didelphidae (American opossums)
  - Subfamily: Caluromyinae
    - Genus: Caluromys
      - Bare-tailed woolly opossum, Caluromys philander LR/nt
  - Subfamily: Didelphinae
    - Genus: Chironectes
      - Water opossum, Chironectes minimus LR/nt
    - Genus: Didelphis
      - Common opossum, Didelphis marsupialis LR/lc
    - Genus: Hyladelphys
      - Kalinowski's mouse opossum, Hyladelphys kalinowskii DD
    - Genus: Marmosa
      - Woolly mouse opossum, Marmosa demerarae LR/lc
      - Linnaeus's mouse opossum, Marmosa murina LR/lc
    - Genus: Metachirus
      - Brown four-eyed opossum, Metachirus nudicaudatus LR/lc
    - Genus: Monodelphis
      - Northern red-sided opossum, Monodelphis brevicaudata
    - Genus: Philander
      - Gray four-eyed opossum, Philander opossum

== See also ==
- List of chordate orders
- Lists of mammals by region
- List of prehistoric mammals
- Mammal classification
- List of mammals described in the 2000s
