= List of mammals of Trinidad and Tobago =

This is a list of the mammal species recorded in Trinidad and Tobago. These are the volant (flying) and terrestrial mammal species recorded for Trinidad and Tobago, and aquatic/marine species. Of these none are endangered and one is considered vulnerable. However, many mammals are locally threatened in Trinidad and Tobago due mainly to heavy hunting and poaching, as well as habitat loss and fragmentation, with a number of species already having been extirpated on the island of Tobago. This list is derived from the IUCN Red List which lists species of mammals and includes those mammals that have recently been classified as extinct (since 1500 AD). The taxonomy and naming of the individual species is based on those used in existing Wikipedia articles as of 21 May 2007 and supplemented by the common names and taxonomy from the IUCN, Smithsonian Institution, or University of Michigan where no Wikipedia article was available.

Species found in Tobago are indicated in brackets after their name, in total there are 24 bats and 16 non-volant terrestrial mammals recorded for Tobago.

The following tags are used to highlight each species' conservation status as assessed by the International Union for Conservation of Nature:

EX	Extinct	No reasonable doubt that the last individual has died.
EW	Extinct in the wild	Known only to survive in captivity or as a naturalized populations well outside its previous range.
CR	Critically endangered	The species is in imminent risk of extinction in the wild.
EN	Endangered	The species is facing an extremely high risk of extinction in the wild.
VU	Vulnerable	The species is facing a high risk of extinction in the wild.
NT	Near threatened	The species does not meet any of the criteria that would categorise it as risking extinction but it is likely to do so in the future.
LC	Least concern	There are no current identifiable risks to the species.
DD	Data deficient	There is inadequate information to make an assessment of the risks to this species.

Some species were assessed using an earlier set of criteria. Species assessed using this system have the following instead of near threatened and least concern categories:

LR/cd	Lower risk/conservation dependent	Species which were the focus of conservation programmes and may have moved into a higher risk category if that programme was discontinued.
LR/nt	Lower risk/near threatened	Species which are close to being classified as vulnerable but are not the subject of conservation programmes.
LR/lc	Lower risk/least concern	Species for which there are no identifiable risks.

== Subclass: Theria ==
=== Infraclass: Metatheria ===
==== Order: Didelphimorphia (common opossums) ====
Didelphimorphia is the order of common opossums of the Western Hemisphere. Opossums probably diverged from the basic South American marsupials in the late Cretaceous or early Paleocene. They are small to medium-sized marsupials, about the size of a large house cat, with a long snout and prehensile tail.

- Family: Didelphidae (American opossums)
  - Subfamily: Caluromyinae
    - Genus: Caluromys
      - Bare-tailed woolly opossum, C. philander LR/nt
  - Subfamily: Didelphinae
    - Genus: Chironectes
      - Water opossum, Chironectes minimus LC
    - Genus: Didelphis
      - Common opossum, Didelphis marsupialis LC
    - Genus: Marmosa
      - Linnaeus's mouse opossum, Marmosa murina LR/lc
      - Robinson's mouse opossum, Marmosa robinsoni LR/lc
    - Genus: Marmosops
      - Dusky slender opossum, Marmosops fuscatus LR/nt

=== Infraclass: Eutheria ===
==== Order: Sirenia (manatees and dugongs) ====
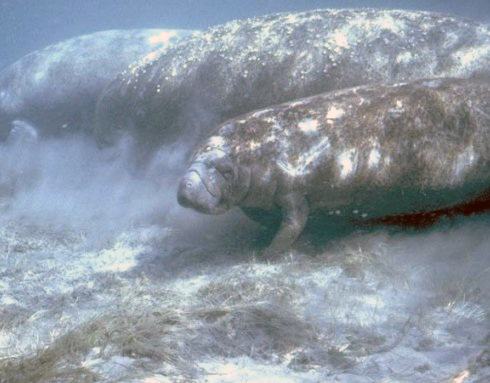
West Indian manatees

Sirenia is an order of fully aquatic, herbivorous mammals that inhabit rivers, estuaries, coastal marine waters, swamps, and marine wetlands. All four species are endangered.

- Family: Trichechidae
  - Genus: Trichechus
    - West Indian manatee, T. manatus VU

==== Order: Cingulata (armadillos) ====
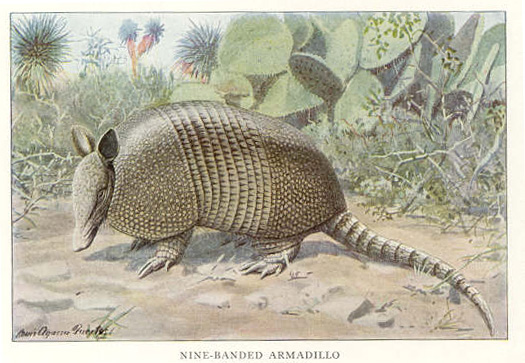
Nine-banded armadillo

The armadillos are small mammals with a bony armored shell. They are native to the Americas. There are around 20 extant species.

- Family: Dasypodidae (armadillos)
  - Subfamily: Dasypodinae
    - Genus: Dasypus
      - Nine-banded armadillo, Dasypus novemcinctus LC

==== Order: Pilosa (anteaters, sloths and tamanduas) ====
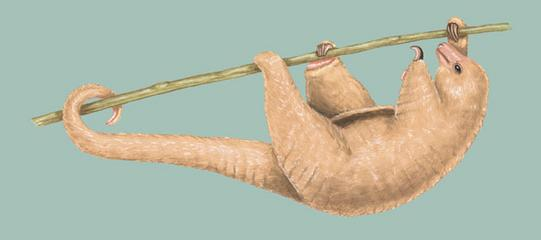
Silky anteater

The order Pilosa is extant only in the Americas and includes the anteaters, sloths, and tamanduas.

- Suborder: Vermilingua
  - Family: Cyclopedidae
    - Genus: Cyclopes
      - Silky anteater, Cyclopes didactylus LC
  - Family: Myrmecophagidae (American anteaters)
    - Genus: Tamandua
      - Southern tamandua, Tamandua tetradactyla LC

==== Order: Primates ====
The order Primates contains humans and their closest relatives: lemurs, lorisoids, tarsiers, monkeys, and apes.

- Suborder: Haplorhini
  - Infraorder: Simiiformes
    - Parvorder: Platyrrhini (New World monkeys)
      - Family: Cebidae
        - Subfamily: Cebinae
          - Genus: Cebus
            - Trinidad white-fronted capuchin, C. trinitatis CR
          - Genus: Sapajus
            - Tufted capuchin, S. apella LC introduced
      - Family: Atelidae
        - Subfamily: Alouattinae
          - Genus: Alouatta
            - Guyanese red howler, Alouatta macconnelli LC

==== Order: Rodentia (rodents) ====
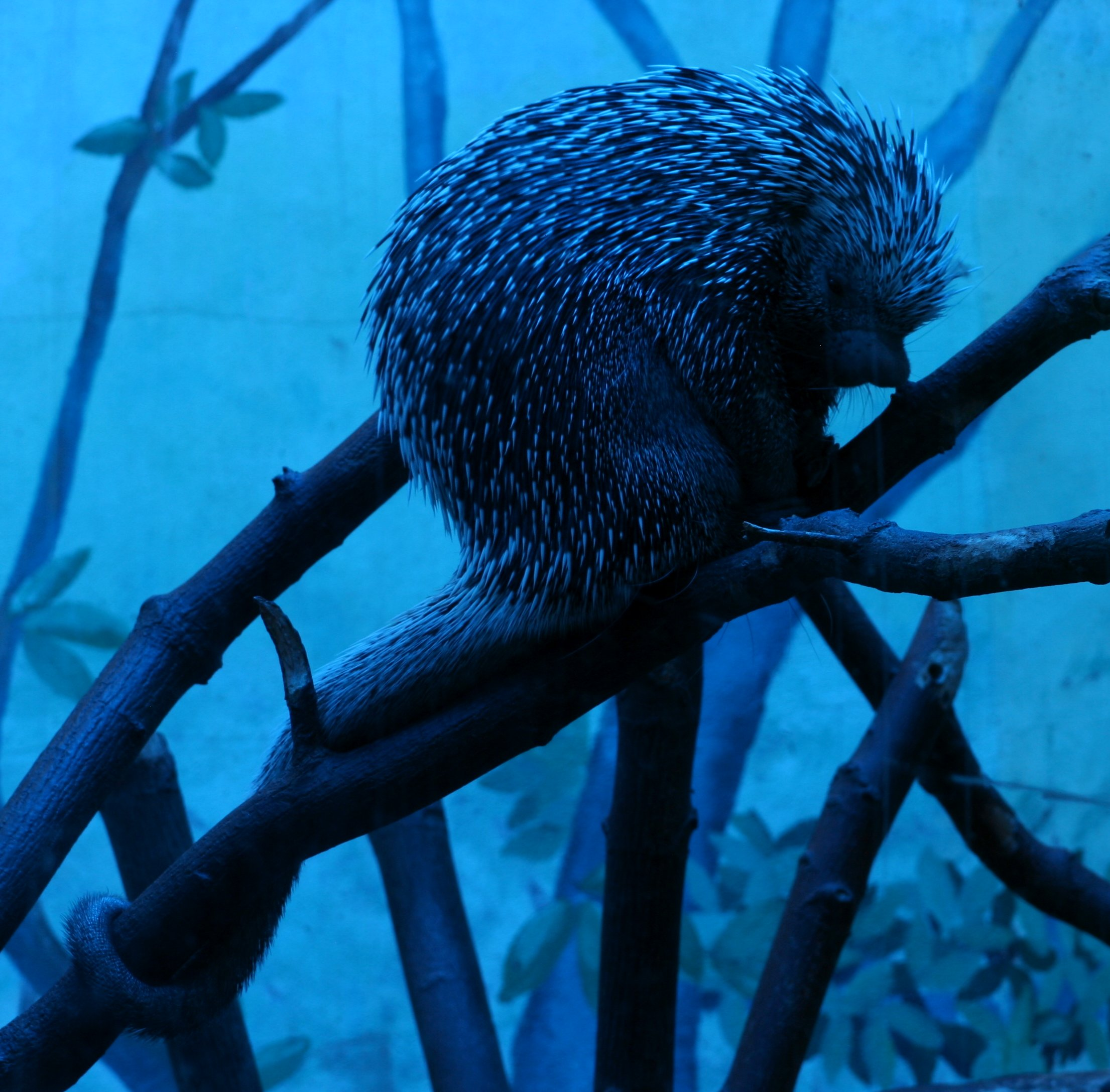
Brazilian porcupine

Rodents make up the largest order of mammals, with over 40% of mammalian species. They have two incisors in the upper and lower jaw which grow continually and must be kept short by gnawing. Most rodents are small though the capybara can weigh up to 45 kg (99 lb).

- Suborder: Hystricognathi
  - Family: Erethizontidae (New World porcupines)
    - Subfamily: Erethizontinae
      - Genus: Coendou
        - Brazilian porcupine, Coendou prehensilis LR/lc
  - Family: Caviidae
    - Subfamily: Hydrochoerinae
      - Genus: Hydrochoerus
        - Capybara, Hydrochoerus hydrochaeris LR/lc introduced
  - Family: Cuniculidae
    - Genus: Cuniculus
      - Lowland paca, Cuniculus paca LC
  - Family: Dasyproctidae
    - Genus: Dasyprocta
      - Red-rumped agouti, Dasyprocta leporina LC
  - Family: Echimyidae
    - Subfamily: Echimyinae
      - Genus: Makalata
        - Brazilian spiny tree-rat, Makalata didelphoides LR/lc
    - Subfamily: Eumysopinae
      - Genus: Proechimys
        - Trinidad spiny rat, Proechimys trinitatis LR/lc
- Suborder: Sciurognathi
  - Family: Sciuridae (squirrels)
    - Subfamily: Sciurinae
      - Tribe: Sciurini
        - Genus: Sciurus
          - Red-tailed squirrel, Sciurus granatensis LR/lc
  - Family: Heteromyidae
    - Subfamily: Heteromyinae
      - Genus: Heteromys
        - Trinidad spiny pocket mouse, Heteromys anomalus LR/lc
  - Family: Cricetidae
    - Subfamily: Sigmodontinae
      - Genus: Akodon
        - Northern grass mouse, Necromys urichi LR/lc
      - Genus: Nectomys
        - Trinidad water rat, Nectomys palmipes LR/lc
      - Genus: Oecomys
        - Savanna arboreal rice rat, Oecomys speciosus LR/lc
        - Trinidad arboreal rice rat, Oecomys trinitatis LR/lc
      - Genus: Hylaeamys
        - Azara's broad-headed rice rat, Hylaeamys megacephalus LR/lc
      - Genus: Rhipidomys
        - Coues's climbing mouse, Rhipidomys couesi LR/lc
        - Venezuelan climbing mouse, Rhipidomys venezuelae LR/lc (Tobago only)
      - Genus: Zygodontomys
        - Short-tailed cane rat, Zygodontomys brevicauda LR/lc

==== Order: Chiroptera (bats) ====
The bats' most distinguishing feature is that their forelimbs are developed as wings, making them the only mammals capable of flight. Bat species account for about 20% of all mammals.

- Family: Noctilionidae
  - Genus: Noctilio
    - Greater bulldog bat, Noctilio leporinus LR/lc
- Family: Natalidae
  - Genus: Natalus
    - Trinidadian funnel-eared bat, Natalus tumidirostris LR/lc
- Family: Vespertilionidae
  - Subfamily: Myotinae
    - Genus: Myotis
      - Attenborough's myotis, Myotis attenboroughi LR/lc (Tobago only)
      - Black myotis, Myotis nigricans LR/lc
      - Hairy-legged myotis, Myotis keaysi pilosatibialis LR/lc (Trinidad only)
      - Riparian myotis, Myotis riparius LR/lc
  - Subfamily: Vespertilioninae
    - Genus: Eptesicus
      - Brazilian brown bat, Eptesicus brasiliensis LR/lc
    - Genus: Lasiurus
      - Desert red bat, Lasiurus blossevillii LR/lc (Trinidad only)
      - Southern yellow bat, Lasiurus ega LR/lc
    - Genus: Rhogeessa
      - Thomas's yellow bat, Rhogeessa io LR/lc
- Family: Molossidae
  - Genus: Cynomops
    - Greenhall's dog-faced bat, Cynomops greenhalli LR/lc
  - Genus: Eumops
    - Black bonneted bat, Eumops auripendulus LR/lc
  - Genus: Molossus
    - Black mastiff bat, Molossus ater LR/lc
    - Velvety free-tailed bat, Molossus molossus LR/lc
    - Sinaloan mastiff bat, Molossus sinaloae LR/lc
  - Genus: Nyctinomops
    - Broad-eared bat, Nyctinomops laticaudatus LR/lc
  - Genus: Promops
    - Big crested mastiff bat, Promops centralis LR/lc
    - Brown mastiff bat, Promops nasutus LR/lc
  - Genus: Tadarida
    - Mexican free-tailed bat, Tadarida brasiliensis LR/nt
- Family: Emballonuridae
  - Genus: Diclidurus
    - Northern ghost bat, Diclidurus albus LR/lc
  - Genus: Peropteryx
    - Trinidad dog-like bat, Peropteryx trinitatis
  - Genus: Rhynchonycteris
    - Proboscis bat, Rhynchonycteris naso LR/lc
  - Genus: Saccopteryx
    - Greater sac-winged bat, Saccopteryx bilineata LR/lc
    - Lesser sac-winged bat, Saccopteryx leptura LR/lc
- Family: Mormoopidae
  - Genus: Mormoops
    - Ghost-faced bat, Mormoops megalophylla LR/lc
  - Genus: Pteronotus
    - Naked-backed bat, Pteronotus davyi LR/lc
    - Wagner's mustached bat, Pteronotus personatus LR/lc (Trinidad only)
- Family: Phyllostomidae
  - Subfamily: Phyllostominae
    - Genus: Glyphonycteris
      - Davies's big-eared bat, Glyphonycteris daviesi LR/nt
      - Tricolored big-eared bat, Glyphonycteris sylvestris LR/nt
    - Genus: Lampronycteris
      - Yellow-throated big-eared bat, Lampronycteris brachyotis LR/lc
    - Genus: Lonchorhina
      - Tomes's sword-nosed bat, Lonchorhina aurita LR/lc
    - Genus: Lophostoma
      - Pygmy round-eared bat, Lophostoma brasiliense LR/lc
    - Genus: Micronycteris
      - Hairy big-eared bat, Micronycteris hirsuta LR/lc
      - Little big-eared bat, Micronycteris megalotis LR/lc
      - White-bellied big-eared bat, Micronycteris minuta LR/lc
    - Genus: Mimon
      - Striped hairy-nosed bat, Mimon crenulatum LR/lc
    - Genus: Phylloderma
      - Pale-faced bat, Phylloderma stenops LR/lc
    - Genus: Phyllostomus
      - Pale spear-nosed bat, Phyllostomus discolor LR/lc
      - Greater spear-nosed bat, Phyllostomus hastatus LR/lc
    - Genus: Tonatia
      - Stripe-headed round-eared bat, Tonatia saurophila LR/lc
    - Genus: Trachops
      - Fringe-lipped bat, Trachops cirrhosus LR/lc
    - Genus: Trinycteris
      - Niceforo's big-eared bat, Trinycteris nicefori LR/lc
    - Genus: Vampyrum
      - Spectral bat, Vampyrum spectrum LR/nt
  - Subfamily: Glossophaginae
    - Genus: Anoura
      - Geoffroy's tailless bat, Anoura geoffroyi LR/lc (Trinidad only)
    - Genus: Choeroniscus
      - Intermediate long-tailed bat, Choeroniscus intermedius LR/nt
    - Genus: Glossophaga
      - Miller's long-tongued bat, Glossophaga longirostris LR/lc
      - Pallas's long-tongued bat, Glossophaga soricina LR/lc
  - Subfamily: Carolliinae
    - Genus: Carollia
      - Seba's short-tailed bat, Carollia perspicillata LR/lc
  - Subfamily: Stenodermatinae
    - Genus: Ametrida
      - Little white-shouldered bat, Ametrida centurio LR/lc
    - Genus: Artibeus
      - Jamaican fruit bat, Artibeus jamaicensis LR/lc
      - Great fruit-eating bat, Artibeus lituratus LR/lc
    - Genus: Centurio
      - Wrinkle-faced bat, Centurio senex LR/lc
    - Genus: Chiroderma
      - Little big-eyed bat, Chiroderma trinitatum LR/lc
      - Hairy big-eyed bat, Chiroderma villosum LR/lc
    - Genus: Mesophylla
      - MacConnell's bat, Mesophylla macconnelli LR/lc
    - Genus: Sturnira
      - Tilda's yellow-shouldered bat, Sturnira tildae LR/lc
    - Genus: Uroderma
      - Tent-making bat, Uroderma bilobatum LR/lc
    - Genus: Vampyrodes
      - Great stripe-faced bat, Vampyrodes caraccioli LR/lc
    - Genus: Platyrrhinus
      - Heller's broad-nosed bat, Platyrrhinus helleri LR/lc
  - Subfamily: Desmodontinae
    - Genus: Desmodus
      - Common vampire bat, Desmodus rotundus LR/lc
    - Genus: Diaemus
      - White-winged vampire bat, Diaemus youngi LR/lc
- Family: Furipteridae
  - Genus: Furipterus
    - Thumbless bat, Furipterus horrens LR/lc

==== Order: Cetacea (whales) ====
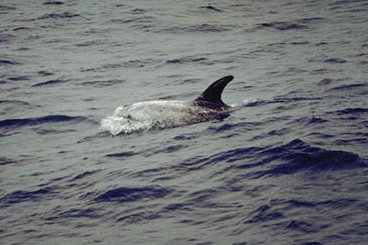
Risso's dolphin

The order Cetacea includes whales, dolphins and porpoises. They are the mammals most fully adapted to aquatic life with a spindle-shaped nearly hairless body, protected by a thick layer of blubber, and forelimbs and tail modified to provide propulsion underwater.

Trinidad and Tobago is within the worldwide ranges of twenty eight cetacean species. Nineteen of these cetacean species have been recorded in Trinidad and Tobago waters and it is expected that more species will be recorded as cetacean research progresses in this area.

- Suborder: Mysticeti
  - Family: Balaenopteridae (baleen whales)
    - Genus: Balaenoptera
      - Common minke whale, Balaenoptera acutorostrata
      - Sei whale, Balaenoptera borealis
      - Bryde's whale, Balaenoptera brydei
      - Blue whale, Balaenoptera musculus
    - Genus: Megaptera
      - Humpback whale, Megaptera novaeangliae
- Suborder: Odontoceti
  - Superfamily: Platanistoidea
    - Family: Delphinidae (marine dolphins)
      - Genus: Delphinus
        - Short-beaked common dolphin, Delphinus delphis DD
      - Genus: Feresa
        - Pygmy killer whale, Feresa attenuata DD
      - Genus: Globicephala
        - Short-finned pilot whale, Globicephala macrorhyncus DD
      - Genus: Lagenodelphis
        - Fraser's dolphin, Lagenodelphis hosei DD
      - Genus: Grampus
        - Risso's dolphin, Grampus griseus DD
      - Genus: Orcinus
        - Killer whale, Orcinus orca DD
      - Genus: Peponocephala
        - Melon-headed whale, Peponocephala electra DD
      - Genus: Pseudorca
        - False killer whale, Pseudorca crassidens DD
      - Genus: Sotalia
        - Guiana dolphin, Sotalia guianensis DD
      - Genus: Stenella
        - Pantropical spotted dolphin, Stenella attenuata DD
        - Clymene dolphin, Stenella clymene DD
        - Striped dolphin, Stenella coeruleoalba DD
        - Atlantic spotted dolphin, Stenella frontalis DD
        - Spinner dolphin, Stenella longirostris DD
      - Genus: Steno
        - Rough-toothed dolphin, Steno bredanensis DD
      - Genus: Tursiops
        - Common bottlenose dolphin, Tursiops truncatus
    - Family: Physeteridae (sperm whales)
      - Genus: Physeter
        - Sperm whale, Physeter catodon DD
    - Family: Kogiidae (dwarf sperm whales)
      - Genus: Kogia
        - Pygmy sperm whale, Kogia breviceps DD
        - Dwarf sperm whale, Kogia sima DD
  - Superfamily Ziphioidea
    - Family: Ziphidae (beaked whales)
      - Genus: Mesoplodon
        - Gervais' beaked whale, Mesoplodon europaeus DD)
      - Genus: Ziphius
        - Cuvier's beaked whale, Ziphius cavirostris DD

==== Order: Carnivora (carnivorans) ====
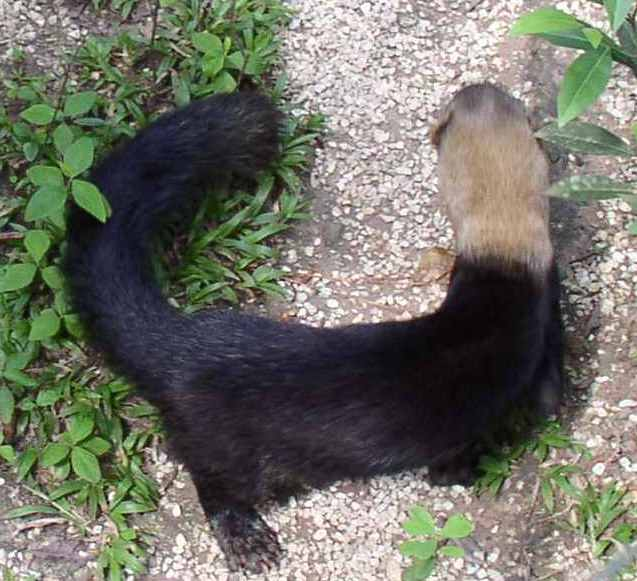
Tayra

There are over 260 species of carnivorans, the majority of which feed primarily on meat. They have a characteristic skull shape and dentition.

- Suborder: Feliformia
  - Family: Felidae (cats)
    - Subfamily: Felinae
      - Genus: Leopardus
        - Ocelot, L. pardalis LC (Trinidad only)
  - Family: Herpestidae (moongooses)
    - Subfamily: Herpestinae
      - Genus: Urva
        - Small Indian mongoose, U. auropunctata LC introduced (Trinidad only)
- Suborder: Caniformia
  - Family: Procyonidae (raccoons)
    - Genus: Procyon
      - Crab-eating raccoon, P. cancrivorus LC
  - Family: Mustelidae (mustelids)
    - Genus: Eira
      - Tayra, E. barbara LC (Trinidad only)
    - Genus: Lontra
      - Neotropical river otter, L. longicaudis LC (Trinidad only)
  - Family: Phocidae (earless seals)
    - Genus: Neomonachus
      - Caribbean monk seal, N.tropicalis EX

==== Order: Artiodactyla (even-toed ungulates) ====
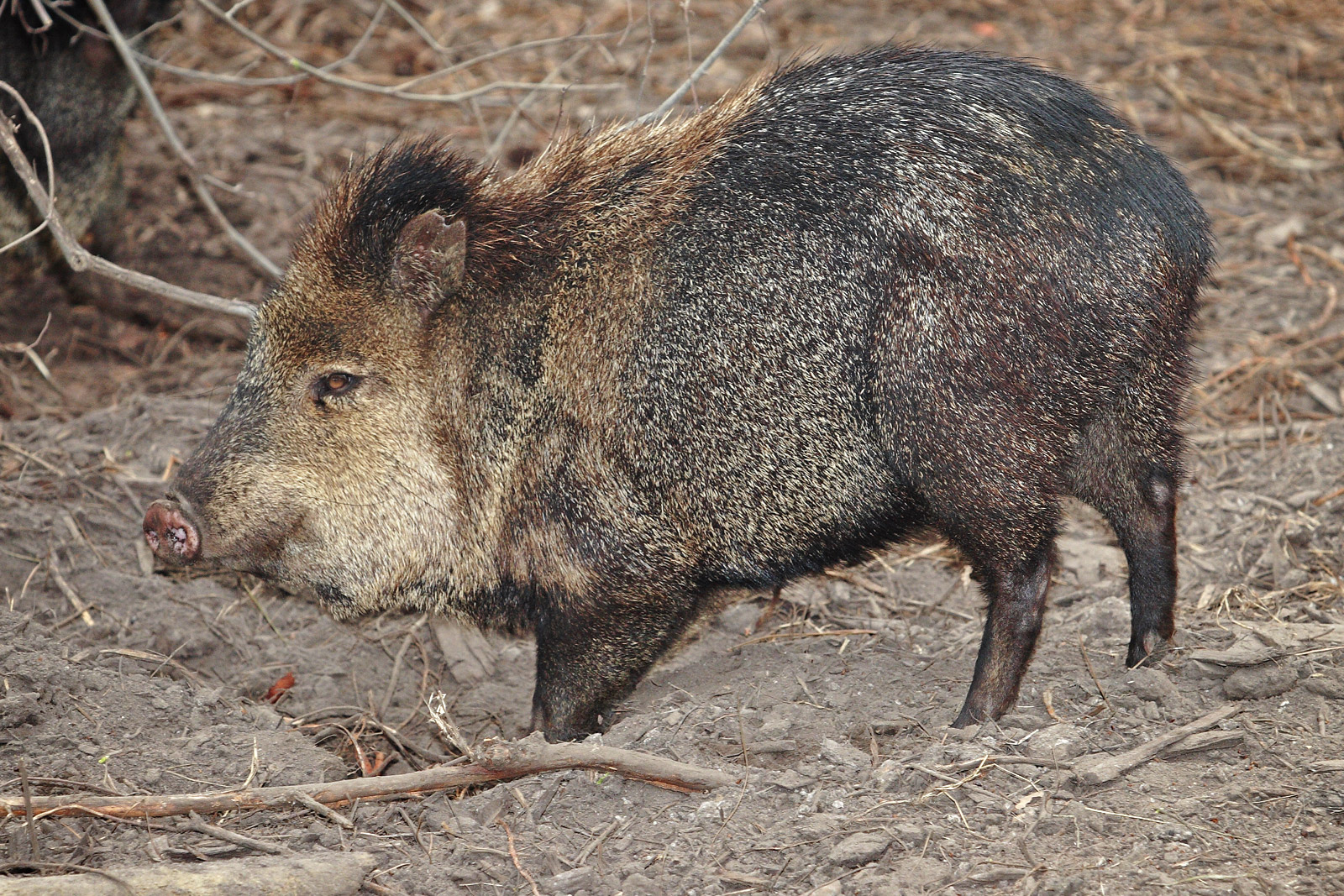
Collared peccary

The even-toed ungulates are ungulates whose weight is borne about equally by the third and fourth toes, rather than mostly or entirely by the third as in perissodactyls. There are about 220 artiodactyl species, including many that are of great economic importance to humans.

- Family: Tayassuidae (peccaries)
  - Genus: Dicotyles
    - Collared peccary, D. tajacu LC (Trinidad)
- Family: Cervidae (deer)
  - Subfamily: Capreolinae
    - Genus: Mazama
      - Red brocket, M. americana DD (Trinidad only; extirpated from Tobago)

== See also ==
- List of chordate orders
- Lists of mammals by region
- List of prehistoric mammals
- Mammal classification
- List of mammals described in the 2000s
