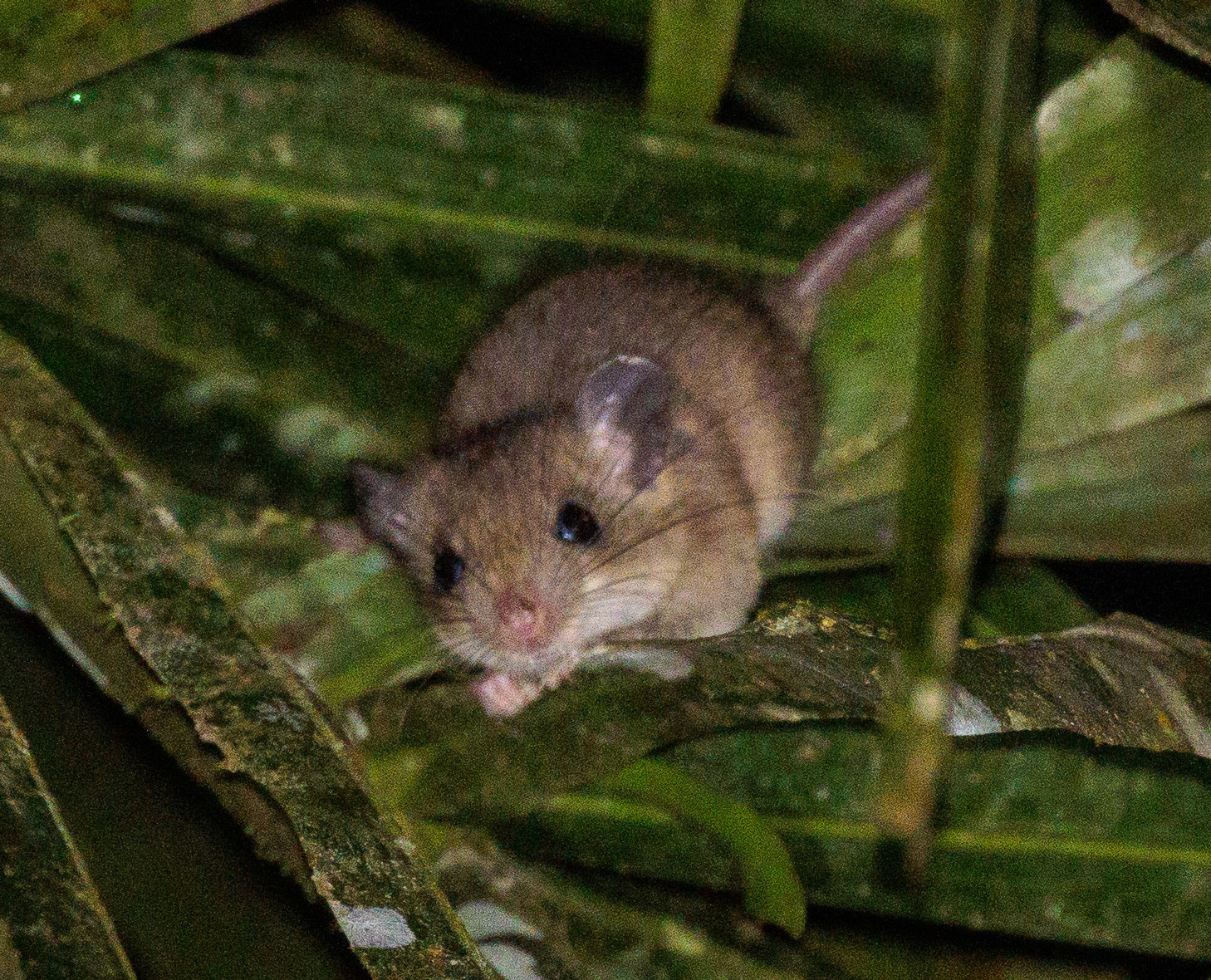

Conservation status
- Least Concern (IUCN 3.1)

Scientific classification
- Kingdom: Animalia
- Phylum: Chordata
- Class: Mammalia
- Order: Rodentia
- Family: Cricetidae
- Subfamily: Sigmodontinae
- Genus: Oecomys
- Species: O. catherinae

Binomial name
- Oecomys catherinae Thomas, 1909

= Oecomys catherinae =

Species of rodent

Oecomys catherinae, also known as the Atlantic Forest oecomys, is a species of rodent in the genus Oecomys from eastern Brazil.

It lives in a variety of habitats including in the Atlantic Forest, Cerrado and Caatinga ecoregions. It is related to Oecomys trinitatis, but has thicker fur.

== Literature cited ==
- Costa, L.P.; Bonvicino, C.R.; Weksler, M.; Paglia, A. (2017) [errata version of 2016 assessment]. "Oecomys catherinae". IUCN Red List of Threatened Species. 2016 e.T136358A115206594.
- Musser, G. G.; Carleton, M. D. (2005). "Superfamily Muroidea". In Wilson, D. E.; Reeder, D. M. (eds.). Mammal Species of the World: A Taxonomic and Geographic Reference (3rd ed.). Johns Hopkins University Press. p. 1137. ISBN 978-0-8018-8221-0. OCLC 62265494.
