= Oecomys auyantepui =

Conservation status
- Least Concern (IUCN 3.1)

Scientific classification
- Kingdom: Animalia
- Phylum: Chordata
- Class: Mammalia
- Infraclass: Placentalia
- Order: Rodentia
- Family: Cricetidae
- Subfamily: Sigmodontinae
- Genus: Oecomys
- Species: O. auyantepui

Binomial name
- Oecomys auyantepui Tate, 1939

Species of rodent

Oecomys auyantepui, also known as the Guianan oecomys and north Amazonian arboreal rice rat, is a species of rodent in the genus Oecomys from South America. It is found in Guyana, Suriname, French Guiana, and nearby regions of Venezuela and Brazil. It is an arboreal rodent known from the understory of primary rainforest, found at altitudes from sea level to 1100 m.

The nematode Guerrerostrongylus marginalis is an intestinal parasite of O. auyantepui.

== Literature cited ==
- Catzeflis F., Barrioz S., Szpigel JF, de Thoisy B. 2014. Marsupiaux et Rongeurs de Guyane. Édition Institut Pasteur de la Guyane, Cayenne, 128 p. ISBN 978-2-9502480-1-5.
- Duff, A. and Lawson, A. 2004. Mammals of the World: A checklist. New Haven: Yale University Press. ISBN 0-7136-6021-X.
- Musser, G. G.; Carleton, M. D. (2005). "Superfamily Muroidea". In Wilson, D. E.; Reeder, D. M. (eds.). Mammal Species of the World: A Taxonomic and Geographic Reference (3rd ed.). Johns Hopkins University Press. p. 1137. ISBN 978-0-8018-8221-0. OCLC 62265494.
- Weksler, M.; Bonvicino, C.R. (2017) [errata version of 2016 assessment]. "Oecomys auyantepui". IUCN Red List of Threatened Species. 2016 e.T136624A115210627.
