= Oecomys cleberi =

Conservation status
- Data Deficient (IUCN 3.1)

Scientific classification
- Kingdom: Animalia
- Phylum: Chordata
- Class: Mammalia
- Order: Rodentia
- Family: Cricetidae
- Subfamily: Sigmodontinae
- Genus: Oecomys
- Species: O. cleberi

Binomial name
- Oecomys cleberi Locks, 1981

Species of rodent

Oecomys cleberi, also known as Cleber's oecomys or Cleber's arboreal rice rat, is a species of rodent in the genus Oecomys of family Cricetidae. Known only from the Federal District in Brazil, its taxonomic status relative to O. concolor and O. paricola is unresolved.

== Literature cited ==
- Musser, G. G.; Carleton, M. D. (2005). "Superfamily Muroidea". In Wilson, D. E.; Reeder, D. M. (eds.). Mammal Species of the World: A Taxonomic and Geographic Reference (3rd ed.). Johns Hopkins University Press. pp. 894–1531. ISBN 978-0-8018-8221-0. OCLC 62265494.
