= Oecomys superans =

Conservation status
- Least Concern (IUCN 3.1)

Scientific classification
- Kingdom: Animalia
- Phylum: Chordata
- Class: Mammalia
- Order: Rodentia
- Family: Cricetidae
- Subfamily: Sigmodontinae
- Genus: Oecomys
- Species: O. superans

Binomial name
- Oecomys superans Thomas, 1911

Species of rodent

Oecomys superans, also known as the large oecomys or foothill arboreal rice rat, is a species of rodent in the genus Oecomys of family Cricetidae. It is found along the eastern slope of the Andes in southern Colombia, Ecuador, and Peru and east into the Amazon basin, including parts of Brazil. Its distribution is poorly known, and it may also occur further south, into Bolivia.

== Literature cited ==
- Musser, G. G.; Carleton, M. D. (2005). "Superfamily Muroidea". In Wilson, D. E.; Reeder, D. M. (eds.). Mammal Species of the World: A Taxonomic and Geographic Reference (3rd ed.). Johns Hopkins University Press. pp. 894–1531. ISBN 978-0-8018-8221-0. OCLC 62265494.
