= Oecomys flavicans =

Conservation status
- Least Concern (IUCN 3.1)

Scientific classification
- Kingdom: Animalia
- Phylum: Chordata
- Class: Mammalia
- Order: Rodentia
- Family: Cricetidae
- Subfamily: Sigmodontinae
- Genus: Oecomys
- Species: O. flavicans

Binomial name
- Oecomys flavicans (Thomas, 1894)

Species of rodent

Oecomys flavicans, also known as the tawny oecomys or yellow arboreal rice rat, is a species of rodent in the genus Oecomys of family Cricetidae. It is found in the mountains of northwestern Venezuela and nearby Colombia.

== Literature cited ==
- Musser, G. G.; Carleton, M. D. (2005). "Superfamily Muroidea". In Wilson, D. E.; Reeder, D. M. (eds.). Mammal Species of the World: A Taxonomic and Geographic Reference (3rd ed.). Johns Hopkins University Press. pp. 894–1531. ISBN 978-0-8018-8221-0. OCLC 62265494.
