= Mamore arboreal rice rat =

Conservation status
- Least Concern (IUCN 3.1)

Scientific classification
- Kingdom: Animalia
- Phylum: Chordata
- Class: Mammalia
- Infraclass: Placentalia
- Order: Rodentia
- Family: Cricetidae
- Subfamily: Sigmodontinae
- Genus: Oecomys
- Species: O. mamorae

Binomial name
- Oecomys mamorae Thomas, 1906
- Distribution of Oecomys mamorae. Extant range Probably extant range

Species of rodent

The mamore arboreal rice rat (Oecomys mamorae), also known as the Mamore oecomys, is an arboreal species of rodent in the genus Oecomys of family Cricetidae. Its distribution extends over much of Bolivia and into nearby Brazil and Paraguay. Although Oecomys has been recorded from Argentina, it is uncertain whether those records represent O. mamorae. It is found in a variety of habitats at elevations from 200 to 2,100 m (660 to 6,890 ft), where it feeds on fruit and green seeds.

== Literature cited ==
- Carleton, M.D.; Emmons, L.H.; and Musser, G.G. (2009). "A new species of the rodent genus Oecomys (Cricetidae: Sigmodontinae: Oryzomyini) from eastern Bolivia, with emended definitions of O. concolor (Wagner) and O. mamorae (Thomas)". American Museum Novitates (3661): 1–32. doi:10.1206/612.1. hdl:2246/5984.
- Musser, G. G.; Carleton, M. D. (2005). "Superfamily Muroidea". In Wilson, D. E.; Reeder, D. M. (eds.). Mammal Species of the World: A Taxonomic and Geographic Reference (3rd ed.). Johns Hopkins University Press. pp. 894–1531. ISBN 978-0-8018-8221-0. OCLC 62265494.
