= Oecomys speciosus =

Conservation status
- Least Concern (IUCN 3.1)

Scientific classification
- Kingdom: Animalia
- Phylum: Chordata
- Class: Mammalia
- Order: Rodentia
- Family: Cricetidae
- Subfamily: Sigmodontinae
- Genus: Oecomys
- Species: O. speciosus

Binomial name
- Oecomys speciosus (J.A. Allen and Chapman, 1893)

Species of rodent

Oecomys speciosus, also known as the savannah oecomys, arboreal rice rat, or Venezuelan arboreal rice rat, is a species of rodent in the genus Oecomys of family Cricetidae. It ranges over northeastern Colombia and much of Venezuela, including the island of Trinidad. This rodent lives in tropical rainforest and tropical dry forest, including secondary forest and gallery forest, as well as in savanna habitat.

== Literature cited ==
- Duff, A. and Lawson, A. 2004. Mammals of the World: A checklist. New Haven: Yale University Press. ISBN 0-7136-6021-X.
- Gómez-Laverde, M.; Aguilera, M.; Rivas, B.; Ochoa, J.; Woodman, N.; Emmons, L. (2017) [errata version of 2016 assessment]. "Oecomys speciosus". IUCN Red List of Threatened Species. 2016 e.T15141A115125468.
- Musser, G. G.; Carleton, M. D. (2005). "Superfamily Muroidea". In Wilson, D. E.; Reeder, D. M. (eds.). Mammal Species of the World: A Taxonomic and Geographic Reference (3rd ed.). Johns Hopkins University Press. p. 1138. ISBN 978-0-8018-8221-0. OCLC 62265494.
