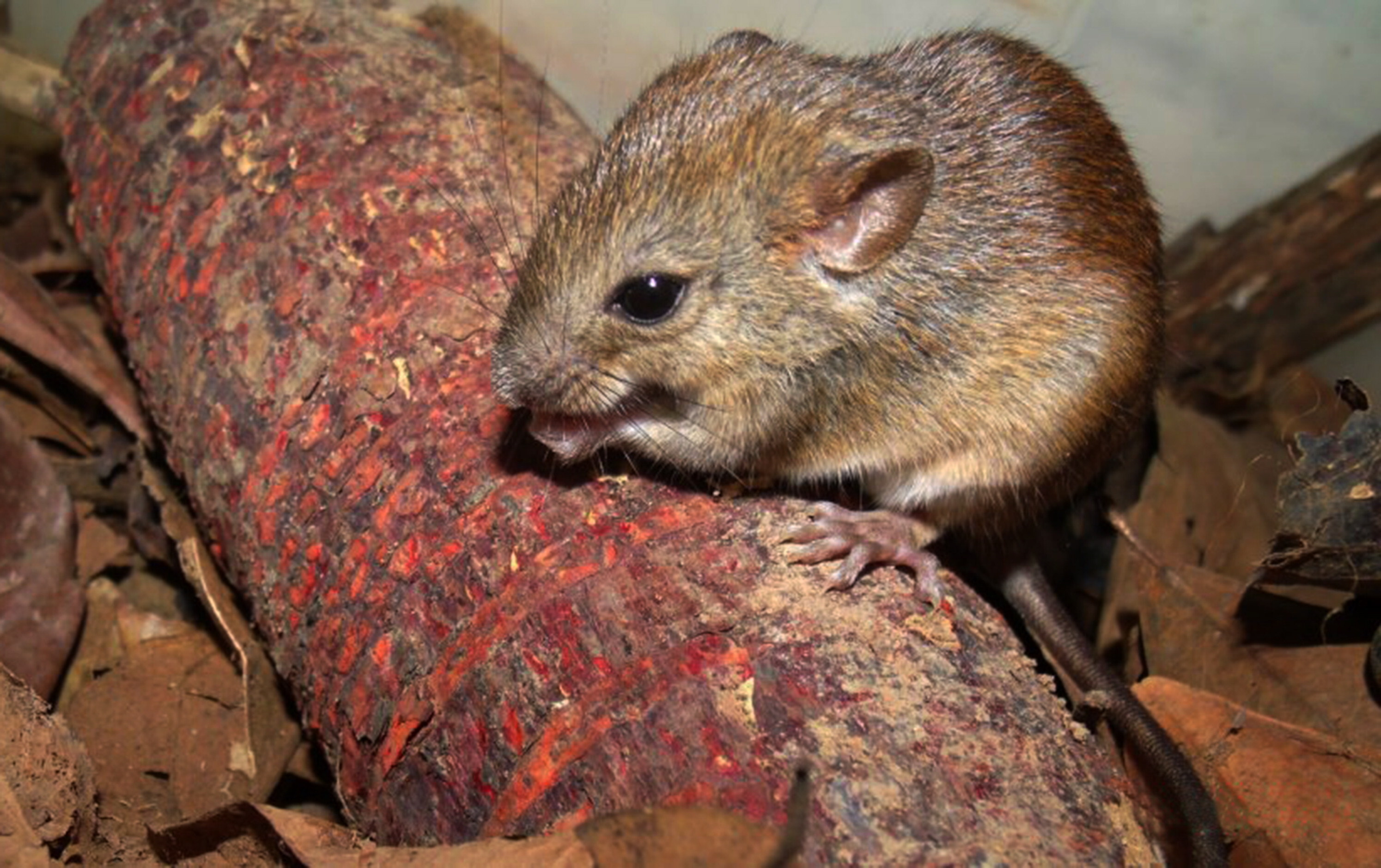

Scientific classification
- Kingdom: Animalia
- Phylum: Chordata
- Class: Mammalia
- Order: Rodentia
- Family: Cricetidae
- Subfamily: Sigmodontinae
- Genus: Oecomys
- Species: O. jamari

Binomial name
- Oecomys jamari Saldanha, Semedo, de Mendonça, Lima-Silva, Messias, Sampaio, Brandão, & Rossi, 2023

= Oecomys jamari =

Species of rodent

Oecomys jamari, also known as the Jamari arboreal rice rat, is a newly described species of rice rat endemic to Brazil.

== See also ==
- List of living mammal species described in the 2020s
