= Anderson's gerbil =

Conservation status
- Least Concern (IUCN 3.1)

Scientific classification
- Kingdom: Animalia
- Phylum: Chordata
- Class: Mammalia
- Order: Rodentia
- Family: Muridae
- Genus: Gerbillus
- Species: G. andersoni

Binomial name
- Gerbillus andersoni de Winton, 1902

Synonyms
- Gerbillus allenbyi Thomas, 1918; Gerbillus bonhotei Thomas, 1919; Gerbillus eatoni Thomas, 1902; Gerbillus inflatus Ranck, 1968

Species of rodent

Anderson's gerbil (Gerbillus andersoni) is a species of rodent distributed from Tunisia to Israel. Their habitats and diets are similar to other gerbils. The gestation period is 20–22 days and the average litter size is four or five. The IUCN formerly listed the junior synonym Gerbillus allenbyi as vulnerable.

== Physical description ==
Anderson's gerbil is a medium-sized rodent with a tail that is long compared to the rest of its body. This rodent has dense fur with a tan color along with some reddish tint on the upper part of the body with a white underbelly. The ears of the gerbil are very large with a dark fur color. The ears of this animal is distinctive in that it does not have the white patch behind the ear as others of the genus Gerbillus. Typical of the species in Gerbillus, Anderson's gerbil has large eyes with a black ring around them. There is a distinct white patch that appears above each of the eyes. The gerbil has long hind limbs while the front limbs are shorter. The length of Anderson's gerbil is estimated from 19 to 27 cm (7.5 to 10.6 in). The tail length can vary from 11 to 15 cm (4.3 to 5.9 in). The mammal can weigh from 15.9 to 38.4 grams (0.56 to 1.35 oz).

== Habitat and distribution ==
Anderson's gerbil usually occupies sandy dunes of deserts and is primarily found in sandy, often solidified, dunes along the coastal regions of its distribution range. This animal can also be found inland and tends to live in sandy areas of valleys or very dry areas, along with mountainsides. Anderson's gerbil inhabits coastal plains of North Africa and the Middle East, from Tunisia and northern Libya to Egypt, Israel, and southwestern Jordan.

== Biology and reproduction ==
Like all other species in the genus Gerbillus, Anderson's gerbil is a burrowing rodent. The evidence for this mammal tends to suggest that it has a nomadic lifestyle considering that the warrens that it builds are not as complex as other genera of gerbils. However, the species sometimes live in groups when they are in a favorable habitat. They occupy a small home range of typically from 32 to 34 m^{2} (340 to 370 sq ft), and are nocturnal. They are seed-eating gerbils and feed on the seeds of the common evergreen Thymelaea hirsuta. The breeding season occurs during late winter and early spring, coinciding with the seed shedding of this plant. Both genders of the species are active for reproductive purposes only once per year. The gestation period is from 20 to 22 days, and litters consist of three to seven offspring. They are sexually mature in their first year after birth.

== Threats ==
This species of gerbil is not technically a threatened species. Under the IUCN redlist, the animal is listed as of least concern and the only threat to this animal mentioned is that overgrazing could be a problem in some parts of the home range of the gerbil.
