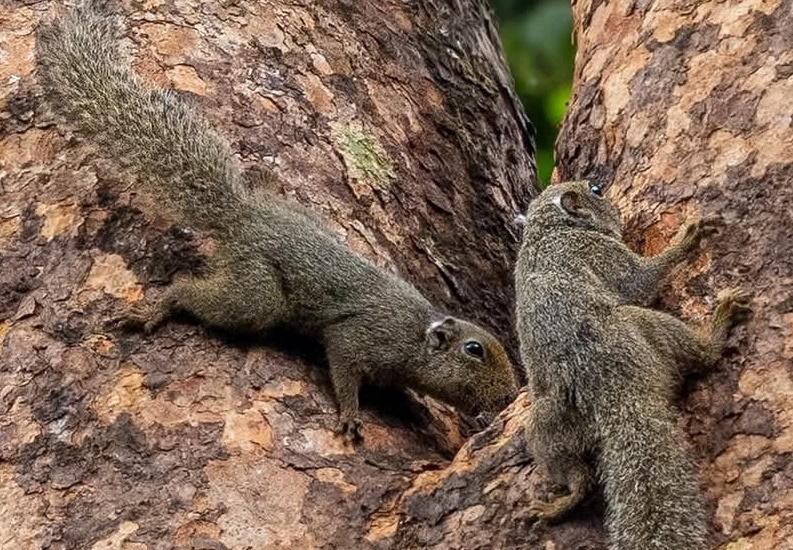

Conservation status
- Least Concern (IUCN 3.1)

Scientific classification
- Kingdom: Animalia
- Phylum: Chordata
- Class: Mammalia
- Infraclass: Placentalia
- Order: Rodentia
- Family: Sciuridae
- Subfamily: Sciurillinae; Moore, 1959
- Genus: Sciurillus; Thomas, 1914
- Species: S. pusillus

Binomial name
- Sciurillus pusillus (É. Geoffroy, 1803)
- Neotropical pygmy squirrel range

= Neotropical pygmy squirrel =

Species of rodent

The Neotropical pygmy squirrel (Sciurillus pusillus) is a South American species of tree squirrel, being the only living species in the genus Sciurillus and the subfamily Sciurillinae. Genetic analysis has shown it to be the sister group to all other squirrels.

== Description ==
The Neotropical pygmy squirrel is the smallest species of tree squirrel native to the Americas, measuring on average just 10 cm (3.9 in) in head-body length, with an 11-cm tail. Adults weigh from 30 to 48 grams (1.1 to 1.7 oz). The fur is grizzled grey over the body, with paler, but not sharply contrasting, fur on the underparts. The head is slightly reddish, with distinct white markings behind the ears, which are shorter and more rounded than on most other tree squirrels. The limbs are slender, with the fore limbs elongated to assist in climbing. Females have six teats.

== Distribution and habitat ==
Neotropical pygmy squirrels inhabit at least four widely separated regions in northern South America, in French Guiana, Suriname, central Brazil, northern Peru, and southern Colombia. Within these regions, they inhabit lowland tropical rainforests. Three subspecies are currently recognised, although their respective geographic distributions are unclear, and these may represent two or more distinct species.

- S. p. pusillus (E. Geoffroy, 1803)
- S. p. glaucinus Thomas, 1914
- S. p. kuhlii (Gray, 1867)

== Biology and behaviour ==
Neotropical pygmy squirrels are diurnal and spend the day in the forest canopy, usually at least 9 m (30 ft) above the ground. They have been observed nesting in abandoned arboreal termite nests lined with fibres gathered from the machimango (Eschweilera) tree. They feed by gnawing on the bark of trees, especially those of the genus Parkia, and probably eating either the gummy exudates produced by the trees in response to injury or the cambium beneath the bark. Population densities are apparently low, with normally no more than three individual per km^{2}, although groups containing more than one adult, plus young, have been observed in areas with a local concentration of food.

These squirrels typically move rapidly through the trees, and are highly excitable, giving an alarm call described as similar to the sound of a cricket. They give birth to one or two young at a time, with pregnant females having been observed in June.
