= Oldfield Thomas =

British mammalogist (1858–1929)

Oldfield Thomas FRS FZS
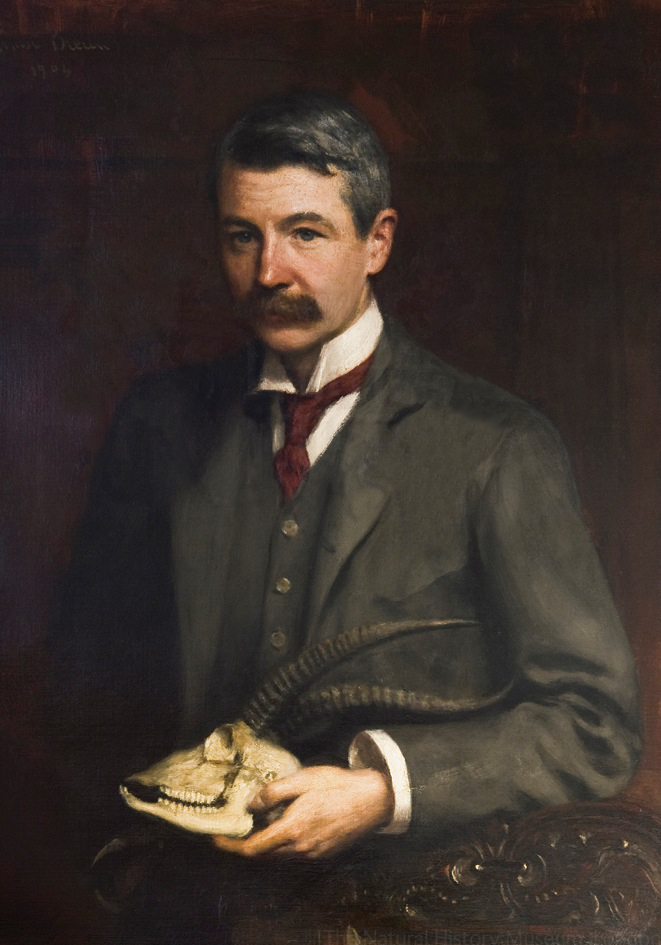
- Painting by John Ernest Breun
- Born: Michael Rogers Oldfield Thomas; 21 February 1858; Millbrook, Bedfordshire, England
- Died: 16 June 1929 (aged 71)
- Known for: Mammalogy
- Scientific career
- Fields: Zoology
- Workplaces: Natural History Museum
- Author abbrev. (zoology): Thomas

Michael Rogers Oldfield Thomas (21 February 1858 – 16 June 1929) was a British zoologist.

== Career ==
Thomas worked at the Natural History Museum on mammals, describing about 2,000 new species and subspecies for the first time. He was appointed to the museum secretary's office in 1876, transferring to the zoological department in 1878.

In 1891, Thomas married Mary Kane, daughter of Sir Andrew Clark, heiress to a small fortune, which gave him the finances to hire mammal collectors and present their specimens to the museum. He also did field work himself in Western Europe and South America. His wife shared his interest in natural history, and accompanied him on collecting trips. In 1896, when William Henry Flower took control of the department, he hired Richard Lydekker to rearrange the exhibitions, allowing Thomas to concentrate on these new specimens. On 6 June 1901 he was elected a fellow of the Royal Society.

Thomas viewed his taxonomy efforts from the scope of British imperialism. "You and I in our scientific lives have seen the general knowledge of Mammals of the world wonderfully advanced – there are few or no blank areas anymore", he said in a letter to Gerrit Smith Miller Jr.

Officially retired from the museum in 1923, he continued his work without interruption. Although popular rumours suggested he died by shooting himself with a handgun while sitting at his museum desk, he actually died at home in 1929, aged 71, about a year after the death of his wife, "a severe blow from which he never recovered."

== Taxonomic descriptions ==
=== Higher ranks ===
1. Deomyinae
2. Desmanini
3. Myzopodidae
4. Ochotonidae
5. Phalangeroidea
6. Procaviidae

=== Genera ===
1. Aethalops
2. Aethomys
3. Ammodillus
4. Ammodorcas
5. Anisomys
6. Anthops
7. Batomys
8. Beamys
9. Belomys
10. Blarinella
11. Brachiones
12. Bunomys
13. Caenolestes
14. Callicebus
15. Calomyscus
16. Caloprymnus
17. Cannomys
18. Carpomys
19. Casinycteris
20. Chiromyscus
21. Chiruromys
22. Choeroniscus
23. Chrotogale
24. Chrotomys
25. Cistugo
26. Cloeotis
27. Clyomys
28. Colomys
29. Crateromys
30. Crossomys
31. Crunomys
32. Ctenomys
33. Cynomops
34. Cyttarops
35. Dacnomys
36. Damaliscus
37. Deomys
38. Dephomys
39. Desmodillus
40. Desmomys
41. Diomys
42. Diplogale
43. Diplomys
44. Diplothrix
45. Dologale
46. Dromiciops
47. Dryomys
48. Epixerus
49. Eupetaurus
50. Euxerus
51. Galeopterus
52. Gerbilliscus
53. Glaucomys
54. Glironia
55. Glirulus
56. Glyphonycteris
57. Glyphotes
58. Grammomys
59. Hadromys
60. Haeromys
61. Harpiola
62. Harpyionycteris
63. Hybomys
64. Hylochoerus
65. Hylomyscus
66. Hylonycteris
67. Hylopetes
68. Hyomys
69. Ia
70. Ichthyomys
71. Iomys
72. Laephotis
73. Lariscus
74. Leggadina
75. Lemmiscus
76. Lenomys
77. Leporillus
78. Leptomys
79. Lichonycteris
80. Lionycteris
81. Lonchophylla
82. Lonchothrix
83. Mallomys
84. Mastacomys
85. Mastomys
86. Melanomys
87. Melomys
88. Menetes
89. Mesophylla
90. Microdillus
91. Microgale
92. Microryzomys
93. Millardia
94. Mimetillus
95. Muriculus
96. Mylomys
97. Myoprocta
98. Myosciurus
99. Myotomys
100. Neacomys
101. Nesoromys
102. Octomys
103. Oecomys
104. Oenomys
105. Oreonax
106. Otomops
107. Parotomys
108. Peroryctes
109. Petaurillus
110. Petinomys
111. Petromyscus
112. Pharotis
113. Philetor
114. Platalina
115. Platymops
116. Poecilogale
117. Praomys
118. Proedromys
119. Pteralopex
120. Pteromyscus
121. Rhabdomys
122. Rheomys
123. Rhynchogale
124. Rhynchomys
125. Sciurillus
126. Scleronycteris
127. Scotinomys
128. Scotoecus
129. Scutisorex
130. Sminthopsis
131. Solomys
132. Stochomys
133. Surdisorex
134. Sylvisorex
135. Taterillus
136. Thallomys
137. Thamnomys
138. Vampyressa
139. Vampyriscus
140. Vampyrodes
141. Xeromys
142. Zyzomys

=== Species ===
1. Admiralty flying fox
2. Asian particolored bat
3. Azores noctule
4. Bare-tailed armored tree-rat
5. Beatrix's bat
6. Bibundi bat
7. Birdlike noctule
8. Bonthain rat
9. Brooks's dyak fruit bat
10. Buff-bellied fat-tailed mouse opossum
11. Dark-brown serotine
12. Dayak fruit bat
13. Desert woodrat
14. Egyptian pipistrelle
15. Ethiopian hare
16. Euryoryzomys macconnelli
17. Forrest's pika
18. Buller's pocket gopher
19. Gerbillus allenbyi
20. Gerbillus bonhotei
21. Gerbillus eatoni
22. Great evening bat
23. Greater bamboo bat
24. Greater Papuan pipistrelle
25. Greater sheath-tailed bat
26. Guadalcanal monkey-faced bat
27. Hairy-footed flying squirrel
28. Harpy fruit bat
29. Hinde's lesser house bat
30. Holochilus chacarius
31. Hylomyscus aeta
32. Indonesian mountain weasel
33. Intermediate long-fingered bat
34. Isabelle's ghost bat
35. Junín red squirrel
36. Korean hare
37. Lagos serotine
38. Large Luzon forest rat
39. Lesser long-fingered bat
40. Light-winged lesser house bat
41. Long-tailed planigale
42. Bengal slow loris
43. Javan slow loris
44. Luzon hairy-tailed rat
45. Maclear's rat
46. Goeldi's marmoset
47. Melanomys robustulus
48. Mindomys hammondi
49. Miniopterus manavi
50. Monito del monte
51. Mount Popa pipistrelle
52. Bare-tailed woolly mouse opossum
53. White-bellied woolly mouse opossum
54. Woolly mouse opossum
55. Mouse-like hamster
56. Neacomys guianae
57. Neacomys spinosus
58. Neacomys tenuipes
59. Nectomys magdalenae
60. Nephelomys auriventer
61. Nephelomys caracolus
62. Nephelomys childi
63. Nephelomys levipes
64. Nephelomys meridensis
65. Nesoryzomys indefessus
66. New Guinea long-eared bat
67. Oecomys flavicans
68. Oecomys mamorae
69. Oecomys paricola
70. Oecomys phaeotis
71. Oecomys rex
72. Oecomys roberti
73. Oecomys superans
74. Oligoryzomys arenalis
75. Oligoryzomys victus
76. Opossum rat
77. Oreoryzomys balneator
78. Oryzomys peninsulae
79. Parahydromys asper
80. Paruromys dominator
81. Persian vole
82. Pratt's roundleaf bat
83. Proechimys roberti
84. Pygmy fruit bat
85. Sculptor squirrel
86. Scutisorex somereni
87. Southern common cuscus
88. Sphaerias blanfordi
89. Spinifex hopping mouse
90. Strange big-eared brown bat
91. Sturdee's pipistrelle
92. Sulawesi giant rat
93. Surat serotine
94. Szechwan myotis
95. Taiwan field mouse
96. Thomas's yellow bat
97. Tiny pipistrelle
98. Velvety fruit-eating bat
99. Inland broad-nosed bat
100. White-bellied lesser house bat
101. White-tipped tufted-tailed rat
102. Woolly flying squirrel
103. Woolly-headed spiny tree-rat
104. Zygodontomys brunneus
105. Zyzomys argurus

== See also ==
- Category:Taxa named by Oldfield Thomas
