= Oecomys roberti =

Conservation status
- Least Concern (IUCN 3.1)

Scientific classification
- Kingdom: Animalia
- Phylum: Chordata
- Class: Mammalia
- Order: Rodentia
- Family: Cricetidae
- Subfamily: Sigmodontinae
- Genus: Oecomys
- Species: O. roberti

Binomial name
- Oecomys roberti Thomas, 1904

Species of rodent

Oecomys roberti, also known as Robert's oecomys or Robert's arboreal rice rat, is a rodent species from South America in the genus Oecomys. It has a broad distribution in the Amazon biome, being found in Bolivia, Brazil, French Guiana, Guyana, Peru, Suriname and Venezuela.
