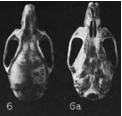
- Skull of Oecomys trinitatis from Corozal, Panama

Scientific classification
- Kingdom: Animalia
- Phylum: Chordata
- Class: Mammalia
- Order: Rodentia
- Family: Cricetidae
- Subfamily: Sigmodontinae
- Tribe: Oryzomyini
- Genus: Oecomys; Thomas, 1906

Type species
- Rhipidomys benevolens

Species
- Oecomys auyantepui; Oecomys bicolor; Oecomys catherinae; Oecomys cleberi; Oecomys concolor; Oecomys flavicans; Oecomys jamari; Oecomys mamorae; Oecomys paricola; Oecomys phaeotis; Oecomys rex; Oecomys roberti; Oecomys rutilus; Oecomys speciosus; Oecomys superans; Oecomys sydandersoni; Oecomys trinitatis

= Oecomys =

Genus of rodents

Oecomys is a genus of rodent within the tribe Oryzomyini of family Cricetidae. It contains about 17 species, which live in trees and are distributed across forested parts of South America, extending into Panama and Trinidad.

== Literature cited ==
- Carleton, M.D., Emmons, L.H. and Musser, G.G. 2009. A new species of the rodent genus Oecomys (Cricetidae: Sigmodontinae: Oryzomyini) from eastern Bolivia, with emended definitions of O. concolor (Wagner) and O. mamorae (Thomas). American Museum Novitates 3661:1–32.
