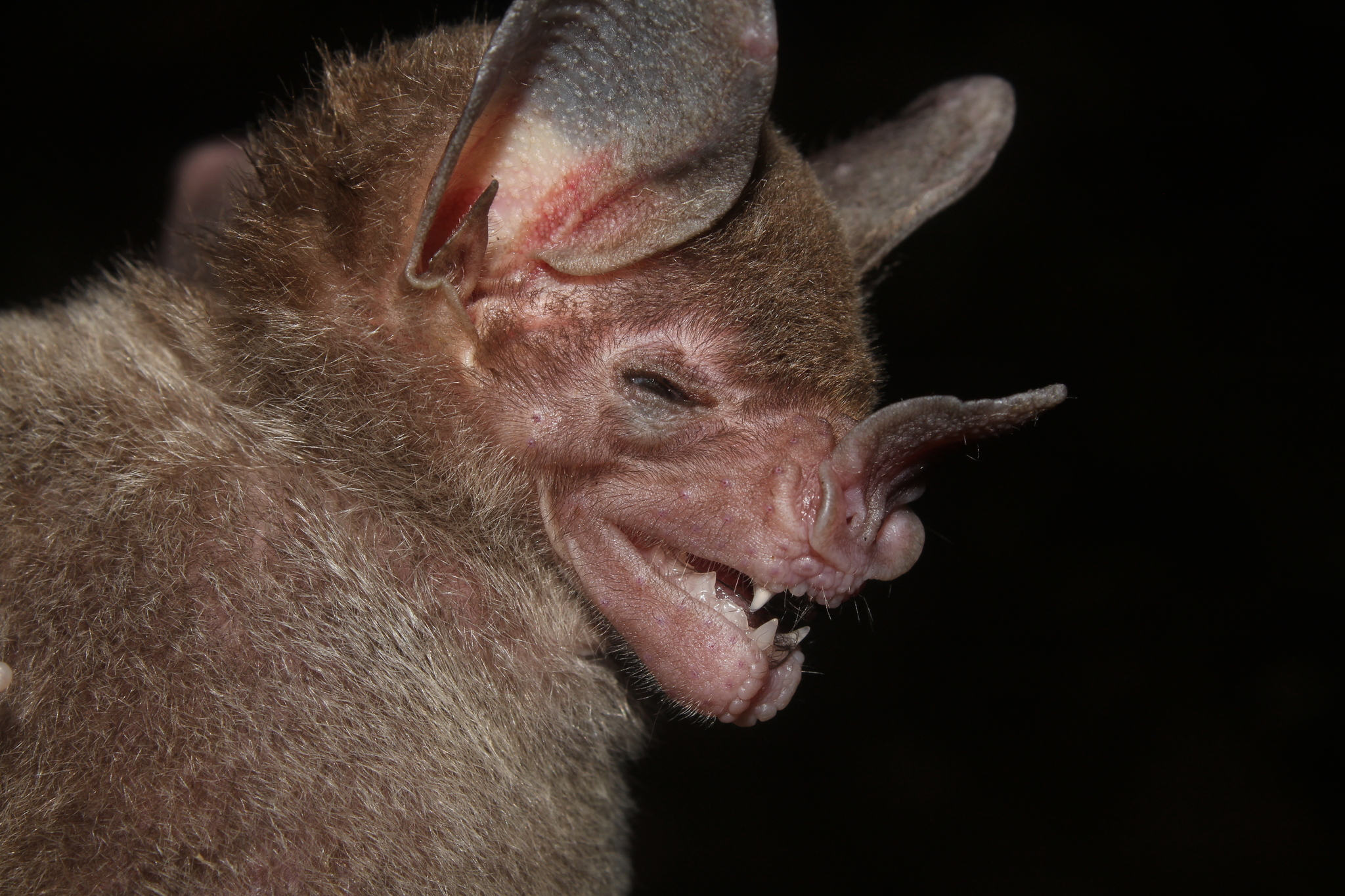
- Pale-faced bat (Phylloderma stenops) in Brazil

Conservation status
- Least Concern (IUCN 3.1)

Scientific classification
- Kingdom: Animalia
- Phylum: Chordata
- Class: Mammalia
- Order: Chiroptera
- Family: Phyllostomidae
- Genus: Phylloderma; Peters, 1865
- Species: P. stenops

Binomial name
- Phylloderma stenops Peters, 1865

= Pale-faced bat =

Species of bat

The pale-faced bat (Phylloderma stenops) is a bat species from South and Central America.
