= Oecomys paricola =

Conservation status
- Data Deficient (IUCN 3.1)

Scientific classification
- Kingdom: Animalia
- Phylum: Chordata
- Class: Mammalia
- Order: Rodentia
- Family: Cricetidae
- Subfamily: Sigmodontinae
- Genus: Oecomys
- Species: O. paricola

Binomial name
- Oecomys paricola Thomas, 1904

Species of rodent

Oecomys paricola, also known as the Brazilian oecomys, Brazilian arboreal rice rat, or South Amazonian arboreal rice rat, is a species of rodent in the genus Oecomys of family Cricetidae. It is found in northeastern Peru as well as central Brazil south of the Amazon, where it lives in lowland tropical rainforests.
