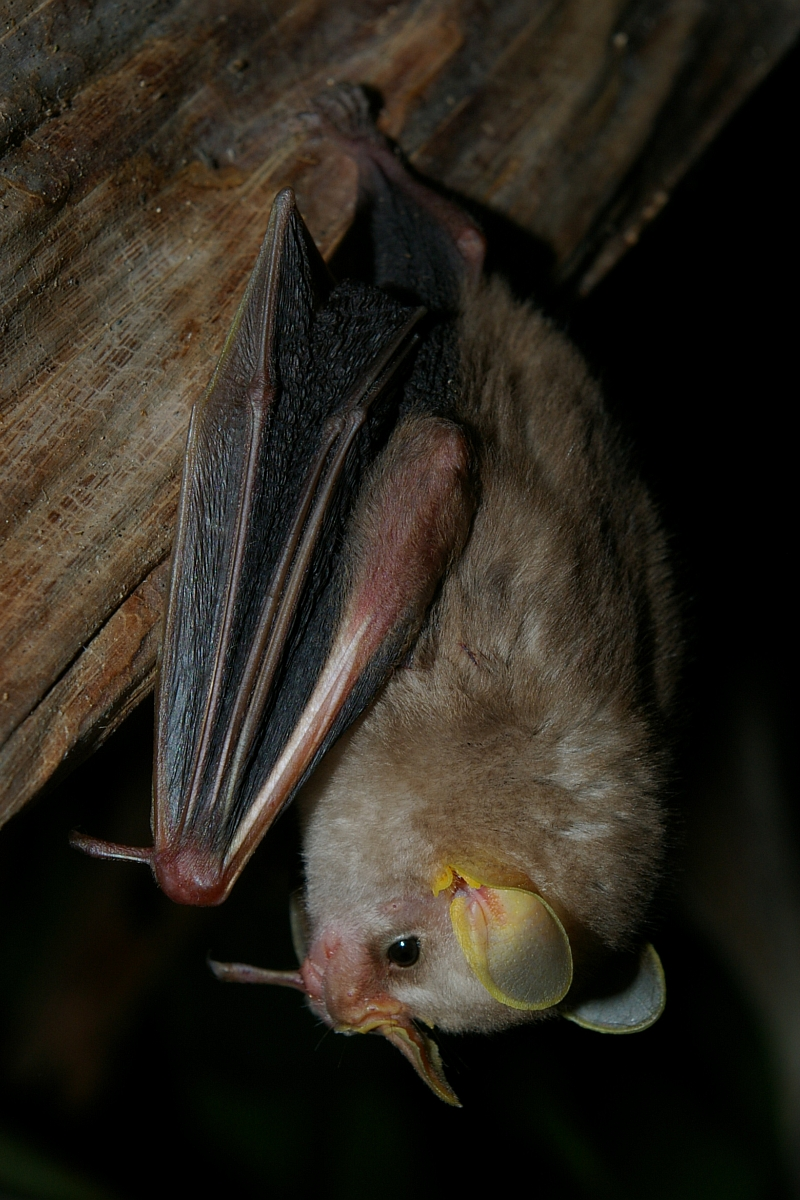

Conservation status
- Least Concern (IUCN 3.1)

Scientific classification
- Kingdom: Animalia
- Phylum: Chordata
- Class: Mammalia
- Order: Chiroptera
- Family: Phyllostomidae
- Genus: Mesophylla; Thomas, 1901
- Species: M. macconnelli

Binomial name
- Mesophylla macconnelli Thomas, 1901
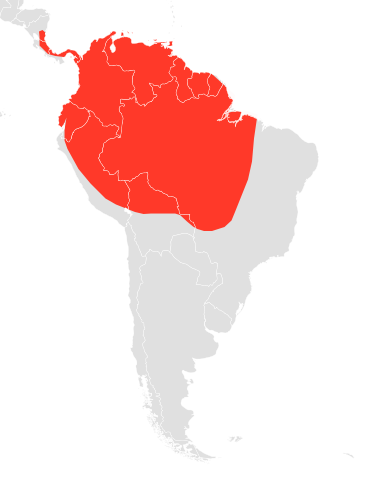
- MacConnell's bat range

= MacConnell's bat =

Species of bat

MacConnell's bat (Mesophylla macconnelli), is a bat species from South and Central America. It is the only species within the genus Mesophylla.
