= Don E. Wilson =

American mammalogist (born 1944)

Don Ellis Wilson (born April 30, 1944, in Davis, Oklahoma) is an American zoologist. His main research field is mammalogy, especially the group of bats which he studied in 65 countries around the world.

== Career ==
Wilson spent his childhood and youth in Nebraska, Texas, Oregon and Washington. After finishing high school in Bisbee, Arizona in 1961 he graduated to Bachelor of Science from the University of Arizona in 1965. Still an under-graduate in 1964, he made his first expedition to the tropics, to which he travelled many times in the subsequent decades to study the mammalian fauna.

After working for the National Park Service in a fire lookout tower in the Grand Canyon National Park for one summer, he attended the graduate school of the University of New Mexico, where he graduated respectively in the discipline biology to Master of Science in 1967 and promoted to Ph.D. in 1970.

During this period he spent the summer months working as a naturalist for the U.S. Forest Service in the Sandia Mountains. His master thesis dealt with the relationships of five Peromyscus species in the Sandia Mountains in New Mexico, his dissertation with the small tropical insectivorous bat Myotis nigricans.

From 1986 to 1988, Wilson was president of the American Society of Mammalogists. In 1992, he was president of the Association for Tropical Biology and Conservation. In addition, he was editor of the Journal of Mammalogy for five years, and editor of the publications Mammalian Species and Special Publications for three years. He also worked in various editorial boards. Wilson is on the board of the organizations Bat Conservation International, the Biodiversity Foundation for Africa, Integrated Conservation Research and in the Lubee Bat Conservancy.

At the same period serving as an administrative officer, Wilson was the vice president (1990-1993) and the president (1993-1996) of The Washington Biologists' Field Club. It was in 1991 when Wilson was in charge of a committee under then president Dick Banks when they saw the field for the Club at Plummers Island and the nearby mainland showing decrease in their biodiversity, where the Club needed more data for invertebrate taxa, to find ways to increase/recover variety and numbers of wildlife species. Wilson's committee was assigned and set to realise how they would make those data available to the biological community at large, utilizing the research grants program the Club has been supporting. (Note: Wilson himself joined the sponsor list at the Washington Biologists' Field Club, for researches on the anuran community at the Occoquan Bay National Wildlife Refuge (2002), bats foraging ecology of the Potomac Basin (1993 and 1996) as well as the bird census project by the Audubon Naturalist Society in the District of Columbia (1993).)

== Publications ==
Wilson published more than 270 scientific publications, including the book Mammals of New Mexico and three monographs on bats. In 1997, the book Bats in Question – The Smithsonian Answer Book was published.

In 2005, Wilson was the co-editor along with DeeAnn M. Reeder of the reference work Mammal Species of the World. (Note: 2nd edition was published by the Smithsonian Institution Press and the 3rd was from the Johns Hopkins University Press.)

For Smithsonian Institution, Wilson published the books Animal, (Note: There is Mammal for the publisher Dorling Kindersley as well.) Human, for Smithsonian Handbook of Mammals as well as a field guide to the North American mammal fauna which was included in the Smithsonian Book of North American Mammals

Since 2009, he is co-editing with Russell Mittermeier the book series Handbook of the Mammals of the World, from the Spanish publishing house Lynx Edicions.

== Honors ==
Wilson won several awards, including "the Smithsonian Institution Awards" for outstanding contributions in the field of tropical biology, "the Outstanding Publication Award" from the U.S. Fish and Wildlife Service, "the Gerrit S. Miller Award" from the North American Symposium on Bat Research, and "the Hartley H. T. Jackson Award" of the American Society of Mammalogists. In addition he received recognition of the Asociacion Mexicana de Mastozoologia for his outstanding scientific achievement and he received an honorary membership of the American Society of Mammalogists.

A species of snake, Myriopholis wilsoni, is named in honor of Don E. Wilson.

== Personal life ==
Wilson lives with his wife, whom he married in 1962 in Gainesville, Virginia. The couple has two daughters (who work as tutors) and four granddaughters.

== Bibliography ==
- Yates, Terry L.; Gannon, William L.; Wilson, Don E. (March 24, 1997). Yates, Terry (ed.). Life Among the Muses: Papers in Honor of James S. Findley. Special Publication. Vol. 3. Museum of Southwestern Biology. OCLC 909470406.

=== For the Smithsonian Instition ===
- Diersing, Victor E.; Wilson, Don E., eds. (1980). Distribution and systematics of the rabbits (Sylvilagus) of West-Central Mexico. Smithsonian contributions to zoology. Smithsonian Institution Press.
- Handley, Charles O. (Charles Overton); Wilson, Don E.; Gardner, Alfred L., eds. (1991). Demography and natural history of the common fruit bat, Artibeus jamaicensis, on Barro Colorado Island, Panama. Smithsonian contributions to zoology. Smithsonian Institution Press. ISBN 1560981466.
- Wilson, Don E.; Reeder, DeeAnn M., eds. (1996). Mammal species of the world : a taxonomic and geographic reference (2 ed.). Smithsonian Institution Press.
- Wilson, Don E.; Sandoval, Abelardo, eds. (1996). Manu : the biodiversity of southeastern Peru [Manu : la biodiversidad del sureste del Perú]. Smithsonian Institution. ISBN 1560987103.
- Wilson, Don E.; Cole, F. Russell, eds. (2000). Common names of mammals of the world. Smithsonian Institution Press. ISBN 1560983833.

=== Handbook of the mammals of the world ===
- Wilson, Don E.; Mittermeier, Russell A.; Ruff, Sue; Martínez-Vilalta, Albert; Hoyo, Josep del; Cavallini, Paolo, eds. (2009). Carnivores. Vol. 1. Lynx. ISBN 9788496553491.
- Wilson, Don E.; Mittermeier, Russell A.; Ruff, Sue; Martínez-Vilalta, Albert; Llobet, Toni; Hoyo, Josep del; Altrichter, Mariana, eds. (2011). Hoofed mammals. Vol. 2. Lynx. ISBN 9788496553774.
- Mittermeier, Russell A.; Rylands, Anthony B.; Wilson, Don E., eds. (2013). Primates. Vol. 3. Lynx. ISBN 9788496553897.
- Wilson, Don E.; Mittermeier, Russell A.; Martínez-Vilalta, Albert; Leslie, David; Llobet, Toni; Hoyo, Josep del; Copet, José Luis; Braulik, Gill, eds. (2014). Sea mammals. Vol. 4. Lynx. ISBN 9788496553934.
- Wilson, Don E.; Mittermeier, Russell A., eds. (2015). Monotremes and marsupials. Vol. 5. Lynx. ISBN 9788496553996.
- Wilson, Don E.; Lacher, Thomas E. Jr.; Mittermeier, Russell A., eds. (2016). Lagomorphs and rodents. Vol. 6. Lynx. ISBN 9788494189234.
- Wilson, Don E.; Lacher, Thomas E. Jr.; Mittermeier, Russell A., eds. (2017). Rodents. Vol. 7. Lynx. ISBN 9788416728046.
- Wilson, Don E.; Mittermeier, Russell A., eds. (2018). Insectivores, sloths and colugos. Vol. 8. Lynx. ISBN 9788416728084.
- Wilson, Don E.; Mittermeier, Russell A., eds. (2019). Bats. Vol. 9. Lynx. ISBN 9788416728190.

Illustrated checklist of the mammals of the world

- Burgin, Connor J.; Wilson, Don E.; Mittermeier, Russell A.; Rylands, Anthony B.; Lacher, Thomas E.; Sechrest, Wes; Llobet, Toni, eds. (2020). Monotremato to Rodentia. Illustrated checklist of the mammals of the world. Vol. 1. Lynx. ISBN 9788416728343.
- Burgin, Connor J.; Wilson, Don E.; Mittermeier, Russell A.; Rylands, Anthony B.; Lacher, Thomas E.; Sechrest, Wes; Llobet, Toni, eds. (2020). Eulipotyphla to Carnivora. Illustrated checklist of the mammals of the world. Vol. 2. Lynx. ISBN 9788416728350.
