= Guy Musser =

American zoologist (1936–2019)

Guy Graham Musser
- Born: August 10, 1936; Salt Lake City, Utah, US
- Died: October 20, 2019 (aged 83); Windermere, Florida, US
- Occupation: Zoologist

Guy Graham Musser (August 10, 1936 – October 2019) was an American zoologist. His main research was in the field of the rodent subfamily Murinae, in which he has described many new species.

Musser was born in Salt Lake City, Utah. He attended elementary and secondary public schools until 1955 and in 1967 obtained a PhD at the University of Michigan with a thesis about the taxonomy of the Mexican gray squirrel (Sciurus aureogaster). In 1966 he joined the American Museum of Natural History where he became curator of mammals. Following his retirement in 2002 he served as curator emeritus.

In the 1960s and 1970s he published numerous articles on squirrels, Neotominae and Murinae. In the 1970s he conducted a three-year expedition to the Indonesian island of Sulawesi where he discovered several new mice and rat species. The results of this expedition are still not fully published.

In the early 1980s he published some of his most important works including Notes on systematics of Indo-Malayan murid rodents, and descriptions of new genera and species from Ceylon, Sulawesi, and the Philippines (1981), The giant rat of Flores and its relatives east of Borneo and Bali (1981), Crunomys and the small-bodied shrew rats native to the Philippine Islands and Sulawesi (Celebes) (1982) and Malaysian murids and the giant rat of Sumatra (1983, together with Cameron Newcomb). These works led to a change within the taxonomy of the Asian Murinae and to the splitting of the genus Rattus into several new genera.

Later he published many articles on various Asian and Australasian Murinae, and also some articles about Sigmodontinae, a subfamily of South American rodents.

Musser was among the authors of the publication Mammal Species of the World (1993 and 2005) where he co-wrote the section about the order Rodentia in collaboration with Michael D. Carleton. He also frequently contributed to the Bulletin of the American Museum of Natural History. Guy Musser was married to Mary Ellen Holden, a zoologist herself and directress of the Upper Elementary in the Trinity Montessori Christian School in Charleston, South Carolina. They have three children and live on James Island (South Carolina).

Guy Musser received the Clinton Hart Merriam Award of the American Society of Mammalogists in 1992.

Musser died on October 20, 2019, in Windermere, Florida. He is remembered eponymously in the names of several mammals, including the rodents Coryphomys musseri, Neacomys musseri, Pattonimus musseri, Pseudohydromys musseri, Reithrodontomys musseri, Soricomys musseri and Volemys musseri, and also in the shrew Crocidura musseri.

== Selected works ==
- 1968: Musser, G. G. "A systematic study of the Mexican and Guatemalan gray squirrel: Sciurus aureogaster F. Cuvier (Rodentia: Sciuridae)". Miscellaneous Publications, Museum of Zoology, University of Michigan. 137: 1–112. hdl:2027.42/56381.
- 1981: Musser, G. G. "The giant rat of Flores and its relatives east of Borneo and Bali". Bulletin of the American Museum of Natural History. 169: 69–175. hdl:2246/568.
- 1982: Musser, G. G. "Crunomys and the small-bodied shrew rats native to the Philippine Islands". Bulletin of the American Museum of Natural History. 174: 1–95. hdl:2246/1021.
- 1983: Musser, G. G.; Newcomb, C. "Malaysian murids and the giant rat of Sumatra". Bulletin of the American Museum of Natural History. 175: 329–598. hdl:2246/572.
- 1992: Musser, G. G.; Heaney, M. R. "Philippine rodents: definitions of Tarsomys and Limnomys plus a preliminary assessment of phylogenetic patterns among native Philippine murines (Murinae, Muridae)". Bulletin of the American Museum of Natural History. 211: 1–138. hdl:2246/906.
- 1993/2005: Order Rodentia In: Don E. Wilson & DeAnn M. Reeder (eds): Mammal Species of the World (w/ Michael D. Carleton)
- 1998: Musser, G. G.; Carleton, M. D.; Brothers, E. M.; Gardner, A. L. "Systematic studies of oryzomyine rodents (Muridae, Sigmodontinae): diagnoses and distributions of species formerly assigned to Oryzomys "capito"". Bulletin of the American Museum of Natural History. 236: 1–376. hdl:2246/1630.
