= White bat =

White bat may refer to:

- Any of the bat species with predominantly white fur:
  - Honduran white bat, a Central American species in the family Phyllostomidae
  - Northern ghost bat, a South and Central American species in the family Emballonuridae
  - Greater ghost bat, a South American species in the family Emballonuridae
  - Lesser ghost bat, a South American species in the family Emballonuridae
  - Isabelle's ghost bat, a South American species in the family Emballonuridae
  - Ghost bat, an Australian species in the family Megadermatidae
- White Bat, an album by He Is Legend
