= Thomas Jefferson University alumni =

Thomas Jefferson University's notable alumni include:

== Early years ==
- Charles Mertz Arbuthnot (class of 1881) (1852-1920), physician and pharmacist in Republic County, Kansas
- Jacob Mendes Da Costa (class of 1852) (1833–1900), physician and pioneer in internal medicine
- John Chalmers Da Costa (1863–1933), chair of the Jefferson Medical College Department of Surgery
- Fisk Holbrook Day (1826–1903), doctor and geologist.
- Isaac Newton Evans (1827–1901), represented Pennsylvania's 7th congressional district in the United States House of Representatives from 1877 to 1879 and 1883 to 1887.
- Carlos Juan Finlay (1833–1915), epidemiologist who discovered mosquitoes as vector of yellow fever
- William S. Forbes (1831–1905), physician and anatomist
- John H. Gibbon, Jr. (class of 1927) (1903–1973), developed first successful heart-lung machine
- Samuel D. Gross (class of 1828) (1805–1884), pioneering surgeon
- John Martyn Harlow (class of 1844) (1819-1907), physician primarily remembered for his attendance on brain-injury survivor Phineas Gage.
- Robert H. Hodsden (1806-1864), physician and Tennessee state legislator
- Chevalier Jackson (1865–1958), pioneering laryngologist
- William Williams Keen (1837–1932), surgeon who assisted in surgery on President Grover Cleveland
- Simon Lord (1826–1893), member of the Wisconsin State Assembly and the Wisconsin State Senate
- Harry Lott (1880–1949), Olympic gold medalist rower, graduated M.D. at Jefferson Medical College, returned as Professor
- S. Weir Mitchell, (1829–1914), experimental physiologist and neurologist
- Ninian Pinkney, (1811–1877), U.S. Navy medical director, active during the American Civil War.
- Orlando Plummer, (1836–1913) doctor and politician in Oregon.
- George R. Robbins (1814–1875), represented New Jersey's 2nd congressional district in the United States House of Representatives from 1855 to 1859.
- J. Marion Sims (1813–1883), pioneering gynecologist
- Charles Skelton (1806–1879), represented New Jersey's 2nd congressional district in the United States House of Representatives from 1851 to 1855.
- Edward Robinson Squibb (1819–1900), developed process to produce pure ether and established E.R. Squibb & Sons, predecessor to Bristol-Myers Squibb.

== Modern era ==
- Jose F. Caro (post-graduate training class of 1977) (1948- ), formerly Magee Professor of Medicine and the 16th Chairman of the Department, best known for his research in obesity
- Cora LeEthel Christian (class of 1971), first woman from the U.S. Virgin Islands to become a physician, former assistant commissioner of the U.S. Virgin Islands Department of Health and member of the national AARP Board of Directors.
- Robert Gallo (class of 1963), (1937- ), co-discoverer of HIV
- Joseph Giordano (class of 1967), led trauma team at George Washington University Hospital following attempted assassination of Ronald Reagan
- Marty Makary (class of 1998), physician, author, health policy educator, and television medical commentator
- Kenneth Margulies (class of 1986), cardiologist and Research Director of Heart Failure & Transplantation, University of Pennsylvania
- Thomas J. Nasca (class of 1975), Chief Executive Director of the Accreditation Council for Graduate Medical Education which Accredits Residency Training Programs in the United States.
- Janice Nevin (class of 1987) (1959- ), President, CEO of Christiana Care Health System
- David L. Reich (class of 1982), academic anesthesiologist and professor; President & Chief Operating Officer of the Mount Sinai Hospital, and President of Mount Sinai Queens; among the first to demonstrate the utility of electronic medical records for large-scale retrospective investigations demonstrating the association of intraoperative hemodynamic abnormalities with adverse postoperative outcomes.
- Arye Rosen (Masters 1980), Academy Professor of Biomedical and Electrical Engineering in the School of Biomedical Engineering
- Gordon Rubenfeld (class of 1987), (1961- ), 2007 American Thoracic Society recipient of John W. Walsh PAR Award for Excellence and Inaugural Chief of the Program in Trauma, Critical Care, and Emergency Medicine at Sunnybrook Health Sciences Centre, Professor of Medicine at the University of Toronto, and Affiliate Professor of Medicine at the University of Washington
