= Edward Spitzka =

Edward Spitzka may refer to:

- Edward Anthony Spitzka (1876–1922), American anatomist
- Edward Charles Spitzka (1852–1914), American alienist, neurologist and anatomist
