= James Garretson =

James E. Garretson
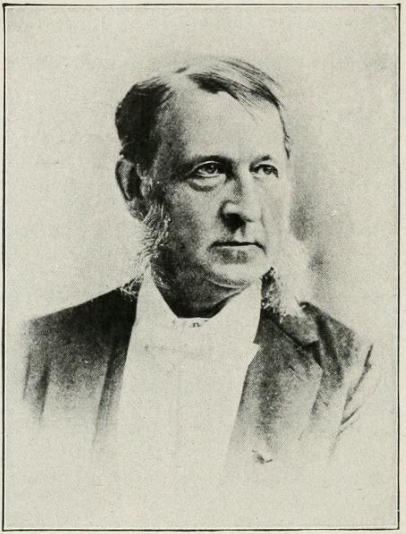
- Born: 19 October 1828; Wilmington, Delaware, U.S.
- Died: 26 October 1895 (aged 67); Lansdowne, Philadelphia, U.S.
- Other name: John Darby
- Education: Philadelphia College of Dental Surgery

Signature
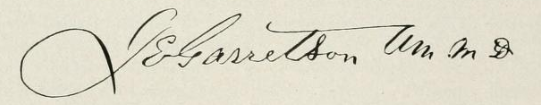

James Edmund Garretson (18 October 1828 – 26 October 1895) was an American professor at the Dental College of Philadelphia, a clinic for oral surgery. With his work A Treatise on the Diseases and Surgery of the Mouth, Jaws and Associate Parts, first published in 1869, he helped to establish oral and maxillofacial surgery as a specialty in the United States. He is known as the father of oral surgery.

== Life ==
James Edmund Garretson was born in Wilmington, Delaware, in 1828. He began studying dentistry during his early years and he first practiced in Woodbury, New Jersey. Dr. Garretson received his dental degree first in 1856. He then received his medical degree in 1859 from Philadelphia College of Dental Surgery (later Pennsylvania College of Dental Surgery). He then married Beulah, who was daughter of George Craft also in 1859.

After obtaining his degree, he joined Dr. David Hayes Agnew at the Philadelphia School of Anatomy. It was from this experience, Dr. Garretson became interested in surgery. He served as the Dean of the Philadelphia College of Dental Surgery. He also wrote under the name John Darby.

He was initially critical of J. Leon Williams histological theories on the development of teeth.

He was buried in the Friends burial ground in Upper Darby. He died of enteritis in 1895 near Lansdowne, Philadelphia.

Garretson was an opponent of vivisection. He served on the Executive Committee of the American Anti-Vivisection Society.

== Oral Surgery ==
It was due to his contributions that branch of Oral Surgery was established as its branch. Dr. Garretson faced criticism from many people who questioned the existence of oral surgery branch and its difference from general surgery in medicine. He was known to be the first person to use Bonwillthe Dental Engine in a surgical operation.

== Positions ==
- University of Pennsylvania Hospital - Oral Surgeon
- Philadelphia Dental College - Dean (1880-1895)
- Philadelphia Dental College - Professor of Anatomy and Surgery
- Philadelphia School of Anatomy - Demonstrator

== Publications ==
- A system of oral surgery and dentistry: Being a treatise on the diseases and surgery of the mouth, jaws, face, teeth, and associate parts. J.B. Lippincott Co. 1869. As "John Darby"
- Brushland.
- Hours with John Darby.
- Thinking and Thinkers.
- Odd Hours of a Physician. J.B. Lippincott Co. 1871. "odd hours of a physician."
- Nineteenth Century Sense.
- Man and His World.
