= Lesser ghost bat =

Conservation status
- Least Concern (IUCN 3.1)

Scientific classification
- Kingdom: Animalia
- Phylum: Chordata
- Class: Mammalia
- Order: Chiroptera
- Family: Emballonuridae
- Genus: Diclidurus
- Species: D. sctutatus

Binomial name
- Diclidurus sctutatus Peters, 1869
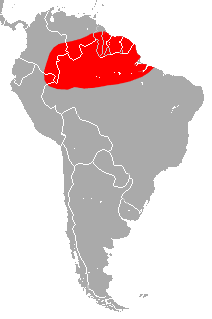
- Lesser ghost bat range

Species of bat

The lesser ghost bat (Diclidurus scutatus) is a bat species found in South America. It is one of six bat species worldwide to have white fur.

== Taxonomy and etymology ==
It was described by Wilhelm Peters in 1869 based on a specimen sent to the Paris Museum of Natural History by Arsène Onessim Barraquin. Barraquin had collected the specimen in Paraguay in 1859. Peters placed it in the genus Diclidurus. Its specific name, scutatus, is of Latin origin, meaning "shield-shaped". Its lineage diverged from other members of its genus around 5 million years ago at the end of the Miocene.

== Description ==
It has long, soft fur that is white or pale brown in color. It is one of only six bat species worldwide that have white fur; others are the other three species of Diclidurus, the Honduran white bat (Ectophylla alba), and the ghost bat (Macroderma gigas). Its claws are black in color. Its forearm is 51–58.9 mm (2.01–2.32 in) long. Forearm length can be used to distinguish it from the closely related northern ghost bat, Diclidurus albus, which has a forearm length of more than 60 mm (2.4 in). It weighs 13 g (0.46 oz). Adult males have two glandular pouches on their uropatagia. These pouches are particularly pronounced during breeding season. The ear is 15 mm (0.59 in) long, and the tragus is 6 mm (0.24 in) long. Its dental formula is 1.1.2.33.1.2.3, for a total of 32 teeth.

== Biology ==
It is insectivorous. It flies quickly at tree-top height or over open water as it forages for food. Because it forages so high, it is difficult to capture and study—almost nothing is known about their reproduction. In one study in French Guiana, researchers captured 8,031 bats as they foraged or roosted, but only two were the lesser ghost bat. During the day, it roosts in palm tree leaves. They will forage in cities where insects gather around street lamps and flood lights.

== Range and habitat ==
Its range includes northern and southeastern Brazil, Colombia, Ecuador, French Guiana, Guyana, Peru, Suriname, and Venezuela. Many observations of it have occurred at elevations less than 200 m (660 ft) above sea level. In Venezuela, it has not been encountered above 1,000 m (3,300 ft) above sea level. They are more likely to be found in tropical rainforests.

== Conservation ==
It is currently evaluated as least concern by the IUCN. While its population trend is unknown because it is rarely encountered, it is not thought that their numbers are rapidly declining. Deforestation is a possible threat to this species.
