= Henry Herbert Donaldson =

American neuroscientist (1857-1938)

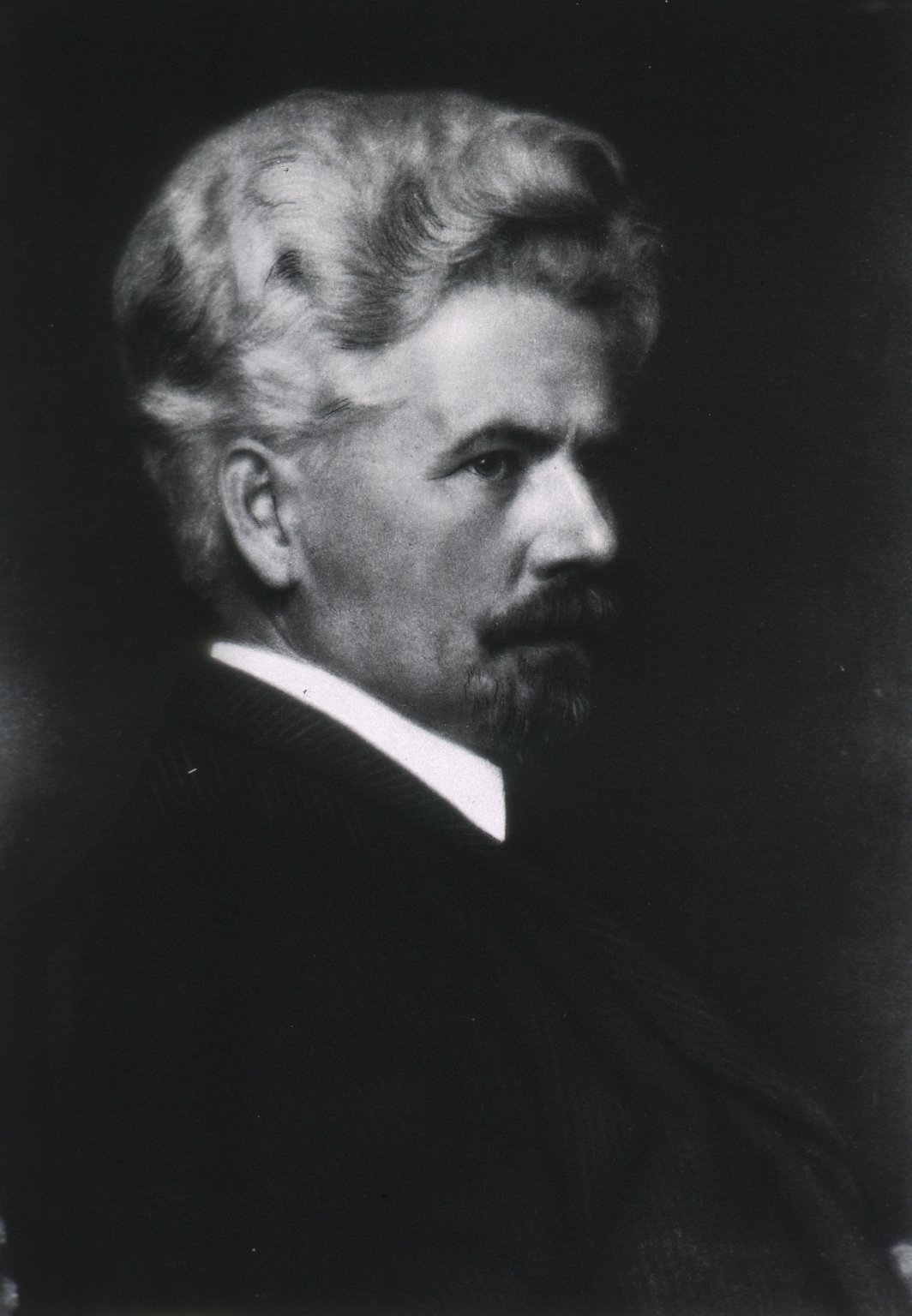
- Born: May 12, 1857; Yonkers, New York
- Died: January 23, 1938 (aged 80); Philadelphia, Pennsylvania
- Education: Johns Hopkins University
- Known for: The book "The Growth of the Brain"
- Scientific career
- Fields: Neurology
- Workplaces: Wistar Institute; Johns Hopkins University; Clark University; University of Chicago
- Doctoral advisor: G. Stanley Hall

Henry Herbert Donaldson (12 May 1857 – 23 January 1938) was an American pioneer of neurology. One of his most influential studies was on the effect of sensory deprivation, based on the study of Laura Bridgman's brain, on the development of the brain which resulted in the landmark work The Growth of the Brain (1895). He served as a professor of neurology at the Wistar Institute of Anatomy and Biology and was a major influence on a generation of American neurologists and was a key promoter of the use of the rat as a laboratory research model.

== Early life and education ==
Donaldson was born in Yonkers, New York, to banker John Joseph and Louisa Goddard (McGowan) both of Irish origins. He was sent to study business but he showed an interest in science and after his studies at Phillips Academy he went to Yale graduating in 1879. He spent an extra year working under Russell H. Chittenden examining arsenic residues in the body. He then went to study medicine for a year but found research was more of his interest than practice.

== Career ==
Following this, he joined Johns Hopkins University in 1881 working under H. Newell Martin on aspects of physiology. He studied the effect of digitalin on the heart and for his PhD, he examined the neurology of the temperature sense under G. Stanley Hall. He then spent some time in Europe under Auguste Forel at Zurich, Theodor Meynert at Vienna and Camillo Golgi at Pavia. Returning to Johns Hopkins, he worked with Hall, following him to Clark University, Worcester. Here he became an assistant professor in 1889 and began to work on the brain of Laura Bridgman which resulted in the monograph on the Growth of the Brain published in 1895.

In 1892 he suffered from an infection of the knee and had to spend some time to recover. He left Clark University following administrative problems in 1892 to join the University of Chicago. In 1905 he moved to the Wistar Institute of Anatomy and Biology at Philadelphia and worked there until his death. Here he began to conduct experiments on rats, following his colleague Shinkishi Hatai, rather than the older model organisms, frogs. This would lead to the production of the Wistar white rat as a standard for research. Donaldson was elected to the American Philosophical Society in 1906 and the United States National Academy of Sciences in 1914.

He served as the 12th president of the Association of American Anatomists from 1915 to 1917.

== Personal life and death ==
Donaldson married Julia Desboro Vaux in 1884 and they had two sons, John C. Donaldson and Norman V. Donaldson. After her death in 1904, he married Emma Brace in 1907. He died of pneumonia on January 23, 1938, and his brain was donated to the American Anthropometric Society. It is currently stored at the Wistar Institute.
