= Edward Anthony Spitzka =

American anatomist

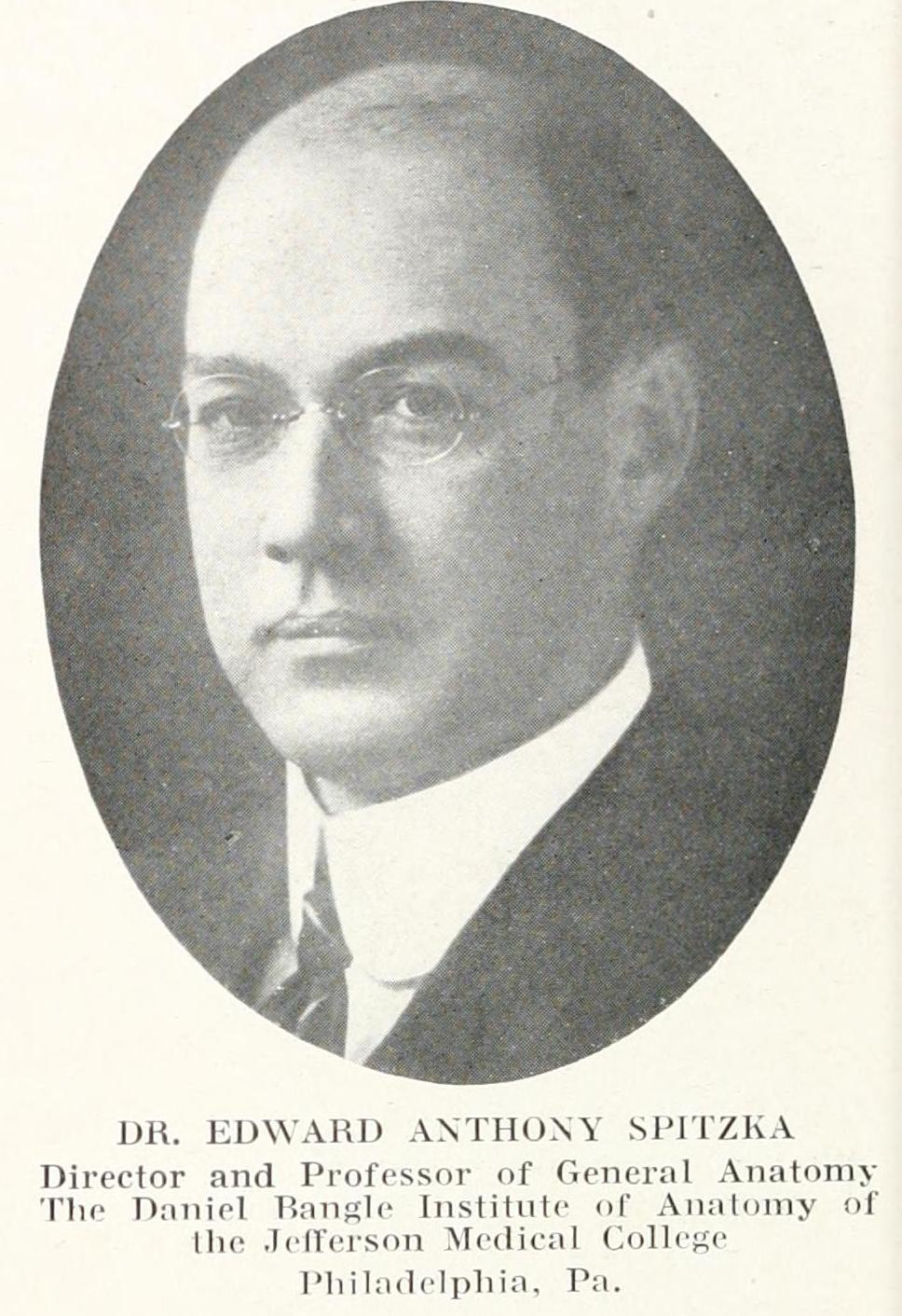
- Born: June 17, 1876; New York, New York, United States
- Died: September 4, 1922 (aged 46); Mount Vernon, New York, United States
- Citizenship: American
- Known for: Autopsy on the brain of Leon Czolgosz
- Spouse: Pauline Eberspacher
- Scientific career
- Fields: anatomist

Edward Anthony Spitzka (June 17, 1876 – September 4, 1922) was an American anatomist. He is best known for performing an autopsy on the brain of Leon Czolgsoz, the assassin of United States President William McKinley.

== Early life and education ==
Sptizka was born in New York City on June 17, 1876, to Catherine Watzek and Edward Charles Spitzka. His father was a well-known neurologist who testified at the trial of Charles Guiteau, the assassin of United States President James A. Garfield.

As a child, Spitzka attended public schools in New York. After high school, he enrolled in the College of the City of New York, now the City College of New York (CCNY), and graduated in 1898. Spitzka then entered Columbia University's College of Physicians and Surgeons, graduating in 1902. During this time, he also served as a member of Company I, Seventh Regiment of the New York National Guard.

=== Autopsy on the brain of Leon Czolgosz ===
In 1901, while still a student at Columbia, Spitzka autopsied the brain of presidential assassin Leon Czolgsoz. The full autopsy of the body included Spitzka, Dr. Carlos Frederick MacDonald, and Dr. John Gerin. Sptizka provided the detail work on the brain, examining portions under the microscope and drawing what he observed. Dr. McDonald remarked on Spitzka's "masterly description of the post-mortem findings and especially of the condition and anatomical structure of the brain." No abnormalities in the brain were found.

== Career ==
After receiving his degree in 1902, Spitzka remained at Columbia University for four years. Spitzka's research focused particularly on brain morphology and its possible relationship to human behavior and ability. He had a special interest in finding biological causes for criminality and genius. In 1906, he was appointed professor and chair of general and descriptive anatomy at Thomas Jefferson University in Philadelphia, Pennsylvania.

In 1907, Spitzka published a detailed study of the brains of members of the American Anthropometric Society. The Society's membership included prominent individuals who had agreed to donate their brains for scientific study. Spitzka performed post mortem examinations of the brains of many distinguished American men, including Prof. Edward Drinker Cope, Prof. Joseph Leidy, Prof. Harrison Allen, Dr. William Pepper, George Francis Train, and Major John Wesley Powell.

Spitzka authored many articles and contributed to the medical reference book Gray's Anatomy, serving as co-editor with John Chalmers DaCosta of the 17th American edition and as editor of the 18th and 19th American editions. In 1911, he was appointed director of Thomas Jefferson University's newly opened Daniel Baugh Institute of Anatomy. In 1912, he stepped away from the work due to a nervous breakdown. He resigned from the Institute in 1914.

In 1917, Spitzka became a member of the 311th Sanitary Train, which provided medical aid to soldiers in Europe during World War I. He was honorably discharged in January 1919. On his return to the United States, he became chief medical officer of the Bureau of War Risk Insurance.

== Personal life ==
Spitzka married Pauline Eberspacher on June 20, 1906. The couple had a son, Edward Jefferson Spitzka, in 1908.

== Death ==
Spitzka died in Mount Vernon, New York, on September 4, 1922, of apoplexy. He is buried in Greenwood Cemetery, Brooklyn, New York.

== Selected publications ==
- Spitzka, Edward Anthony (January 5, 1901). "The Mesial Relations of the Inflected Fissure: Observations upon One Hundred Brains". New York Medical Journal. 73: 6–10.
- Spitzka, Edward Anthony (1901). "A Preliminary Communication with Projection-Drawings, Illustrating the Topography of the Paracœles (Lateral Ventricles) in Their Relations to the Surface of the Cerebrum and the Cranium". New York Medical Journal. 73: 177–182.
- Spitzka, Edward Anthony (April 6, 1901). "A Preliminary Communication of a Study of the Brains of Two Distinguished Physicians, Father and Son". The Philadelphia Medical Journal. 7: 680–688.
- Spitzka, Edward Anthony (June 1901). "A Contribution to the Fissural Integrality of the Paroccipital: Observations upon One Hundred Brains". The Journal of Mental Pathology. 1 (1): 25–33.
- Spitzka, Edward Anthony (June 15, 1901). "The Redundancy of the Preinsula in the Brains of Distinguished Educated Men". Medical Record. 59: 940–943.
- Spitzka, Edward Anthony (August 24, 1901). "Is the Central Fissure Duplicated in the Brain of Carlo Giacomini, Anatomist? A Note on a Fissural Anomaly". The Philadelphia Medical Journal. 8: 319–323.
- Spitzka, Edward Anthony (1901). "The Czolgosz Case". The Philadelphia Medical Journal. 8: 693–695.
- Spitzka, Edward Anthony (January 1902). "The Post-Mortem Examination of Leon F. Czolgosz, the Assassin of President McKinley". American Journal of Insanity. 58 (3): 386–404. doi:10.1176/ajp.58.3.386.
- Spitzka, Edward Anthony (1902). "Remarks on the Czolgosz Case and Allied Questions as Presented by E. S. Talbot". The Medical Critic: 17–28.
- Spitzka, Edward Anthony (1902). "Contributions to the Encephalic Anatomy of the Races. First Paper: Three Eskimo Brains, from Smith's Sound". American Journal of Anatomy. 2: 25–71. doi:10.1002/aja.1000020104.
- Spitzka, Edward Anthony (April 1903). "Brain-weights of Animals with Special Reference to the Weight of the Brain in the Macaque Monkey". Journal of Comparative Neurology. 13 (1): 9–17. doi:10.1002/cne.910130103.
- Spitzka, Edward Anthony (1903). "The Postorbital Limbus: A Formation Occasionally Met with at the Base of the Human Brain". The Philadelphia Medical Journal. 11: 646–648.
- Spitzka, Edward Anthony (May 2, 1903). "A Study of the Brain-weights of Men Notable in the Professions, Arts and Sciences". The Philadelphia Medical Journal. 11: 757–761.
- Spitzka, Edward Anthony (1903). "Autopsy on Electrocuted Criminal, Toni Turckofski, a Polish Murderer, Executed at Sing Sing Prison, Aug., 1903". The Medical Critic: 1200–1203.
- Spitzka, Edward Anthony (November 4, 1904). "The Brain of a Swedish Statesman". Science. 20 (514): 612–613. Bibcode:1904Sci....20..612S. doi:10.1126/science.20.514.612. PMID 17775471.
- Spitzka, Edward Anthony (June 30, 1905). "The Brain of the Histologist and Physiologist Otto C. Lovén". Science. 21 (548): 994. doi:10.1126/science.21.548.994-a. PMID 17793114.
- Spitzka, Edw. Anthony (1908). "Observations Regarding the Infliction of the Death Penalty by Electricity". Proceedings of the American Philosophical Society. 47 (188): 39–50.
- Spitzka, Edw. Anthony (1908). "Preliminary Note on the Brains of Natives of the Andaman and Nicobar Islands". Proceedings of the American Philosophical Society. 47 (188): 51–58. JSTOR 983797.
- Co-edited with J. C. DaCosta, Gray's Anatomy, 17th American edition (September 1908).
- Spitzka, Edward Anthony (1909). "The Resuscitation of Persons Shocked by Electricity". Journal of the Medical Society of New Jersey. 5: 549–555.
- Edited Gray's Anatomy, 18th American edition (October 1910).
- Spitzka, Edward Anthony; Radasch, Henry E. (September 1912). "The Brain Lesions Produced by Electricity as Observed after Legal Electrocution". The American Journal of the Medical Sciences. 144 (3): 341–347. doi:10.1097/00000441-191209000-00004.
- Edited Gray's Anatomy, 19th American edition (July 1913).
- Spitzka, Edward Anthony (1916). "Depletion of Nerve Force in Neurasthenic States and Eye-strain, Reflex Headaches and Ocular Vertigo". The Optical Journal and Review of Optometry: 909–913.
