= David Hayes Agnew =

American anatomist, surgeon, and educator (1818–1892)

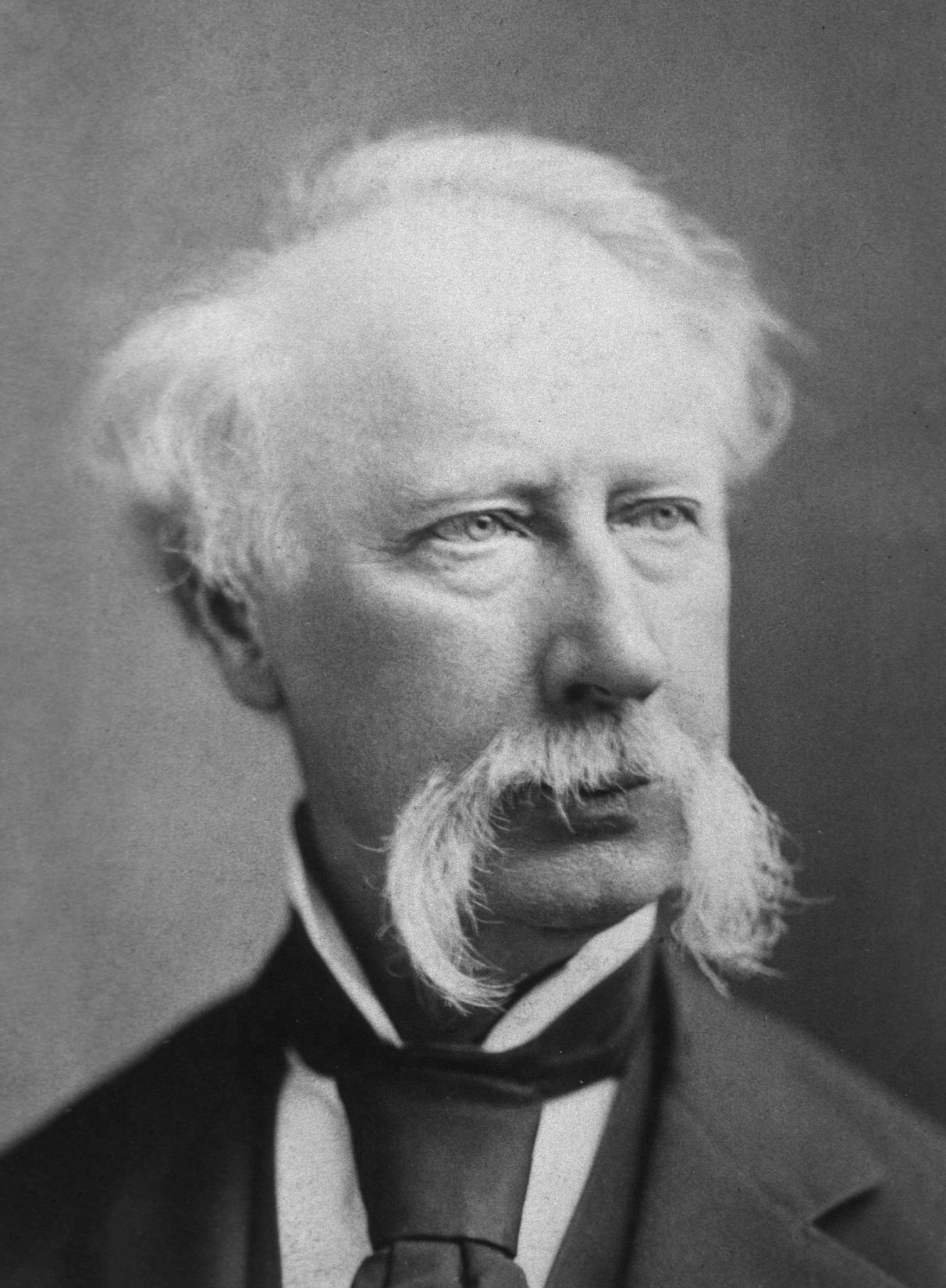
- Born: November 24, 1818; Christiana, Pennsylvania, U.S.
- Died: March 22, 1892 (aged 73); Philadelphia, Pennsylvania, U.S.
- Resting place: West Laurel Hill Cemetery, Bala Cynwyd, Pennsylvania, U.S.
- Education: University of Pennsylvania School of Medicine
- Relatives: Margaret Creighton (Irwin) Agnew (wife)
- Medical career
- Profession: anatomist, surgeon, professor
- Institutions: Mower General Hospital; Pennsylvania Hospital; Philadelphia School of Anatomy; Satterlee General Hospital; University of Pennsylvania; Wills Eye Hospital
- Notable works: The Principles and Practice of Surgery

David Hayes Agnew (November 24, 1818 – March 22, 1892) was an American surgeon, anatomist, and educator. During the American Civil War he worked as a surgeon at Satterlee General Hospital, Hestonville Military Hospital, and as consulting surgeon to a staff of 47 resident physicians at Mower General Hospital in Philadelphia. He purchased and taught at the Philadelphia School of Anatomy and founded the Philadelphia School of Operative Anatomy. He worked as a surgeon at the Philadelphia General Hospital, Pennsylvania Hospital, Wills Eye Hospital, and Orthopedic Hospital.

He held multiple academic positions at the University of Pennsylvania including professor of clinical surgery, professor of principles and practices of surgery, professor emeritus of surgery, and honorary professor of clinical surgery. He served as president of several medical societies including the American Surgical Association and the College of Physicians of Philadelphia. He was the chief surgeon in attendance after the shooting of President James A. Garfield.

The Agnew Clinic painting by Thomas Eakins was commissioned in 1889 to commemorate Agnew's retirement from the University of Pennsylvania.

== Early life and education ==
Agnew was born on November 24, 1818, in Nobleville, Pennsylvania, (present-day Christiana, Pennsylvania), to Robert Agnew and Agnes Noble.

In 1833, he entered Jefferson College, but left in 1834 and enrolled in Newark College in Newark, Delaware, where his cousin John Holmes Agnew was a professor of languages. Agnew left Newark College after just one year when his cousin left and Agnew returned home to study medicine under his father. He entered the University of Pennsylvania School of Medicine in 1836 and graduated with an M.D. degree on April 6, 1838.

He received an A.M. and LL.D. degree from Princeton University and a LL.D. degree from the University of Pennsylvania.

== Career ==
He returned to Nobleville to help his father in his clinic and worked there for two years. In 1843, he partnered with his brothers-in-law to form an iron foundry business named Irwin & Agnew. The business failed in 1846 leaving him in debt and he returned to the practice of medicine in Cochranville, Pennsylvania. He wanted to focus on surgery and acquired cadavers from Philadelphia to practice his dissection technique.

He caused a scandal in town when he left the used cadavers in a nearby pond to allow eels to consume the soft tissue and leave the skeletons for medical use. He was asked to leave Cochranville and moved to Philadelphia after it was revealed that eels sold in town for human consumption were sourced from that pond.

In 1852, he purchased the Philadelphia School of Anatomy for $600 and taught there for ten years. In 1854, he worked as a surgeon in the Philadelphia General Hospital and founded the pathological museum. He managed the pathological museum until 1867 when he transferred responsibility to William Pepper. He became the demonstrator of anatomy and assistant lecturer on clinical surgery at The University of Pennsylvania.

In June 1862 he worked as acting assistant surgeon In the United States Army at Satterlee General Hospital and the Hestonville Military Hospital in West Philadelphia. His contract expired in October 1862 and he was assigned as Surgeon of Volunteers. He was consulting surgeon to a staff of 47 resident physicians at the Mower General Hospital, in the Chestnut Hill neighborhood of Philadelphia. After the Battle of Gettysburg, he traveled to field hospitals near the battlefield and administered care, including to General Winfield Scott Hancock. This was his first experience with military surgery and an emerging medical field due to the proliferation of gunshot wounds and injuries and diseases due to military activities of the American Civil War. The depth of experience he obtained during the war burnished his reputation as one of the top surgeons in the United States and an expert on gunshot wounds.

In 1863, he founded the Philadelphia School of Operative Surgery and worked as a surgeon at Wills Eye Hospital. In 1864, he was appointed surgeon at Pennsylvania Hospital and in 1867, surgeon to Orthopedic Hospital.

At the University of Pennsylvania, he was appointed professor of clinical surgery in 1870; professor of principles and practices of surgery in 1871; and professor emeritus of surgery and honorary professor of clinical surgery in 1889. He was elected as a member of the American Philosophical Society in 1872. He served as president of the Philadelphia County Medical Society in 1870, the Pennsylvania State Society in 1877, the Philadelphia Academy of Surgery in 1888, and the American Surgical Association in 1888. He served as manager of the Philadelphia House of Refuge for thirty-three years and served on the board of directors of the Philadelphia Dental College and the Franklin Institute. He was elected president of the College of Physicians of Philadelphia in 1890.

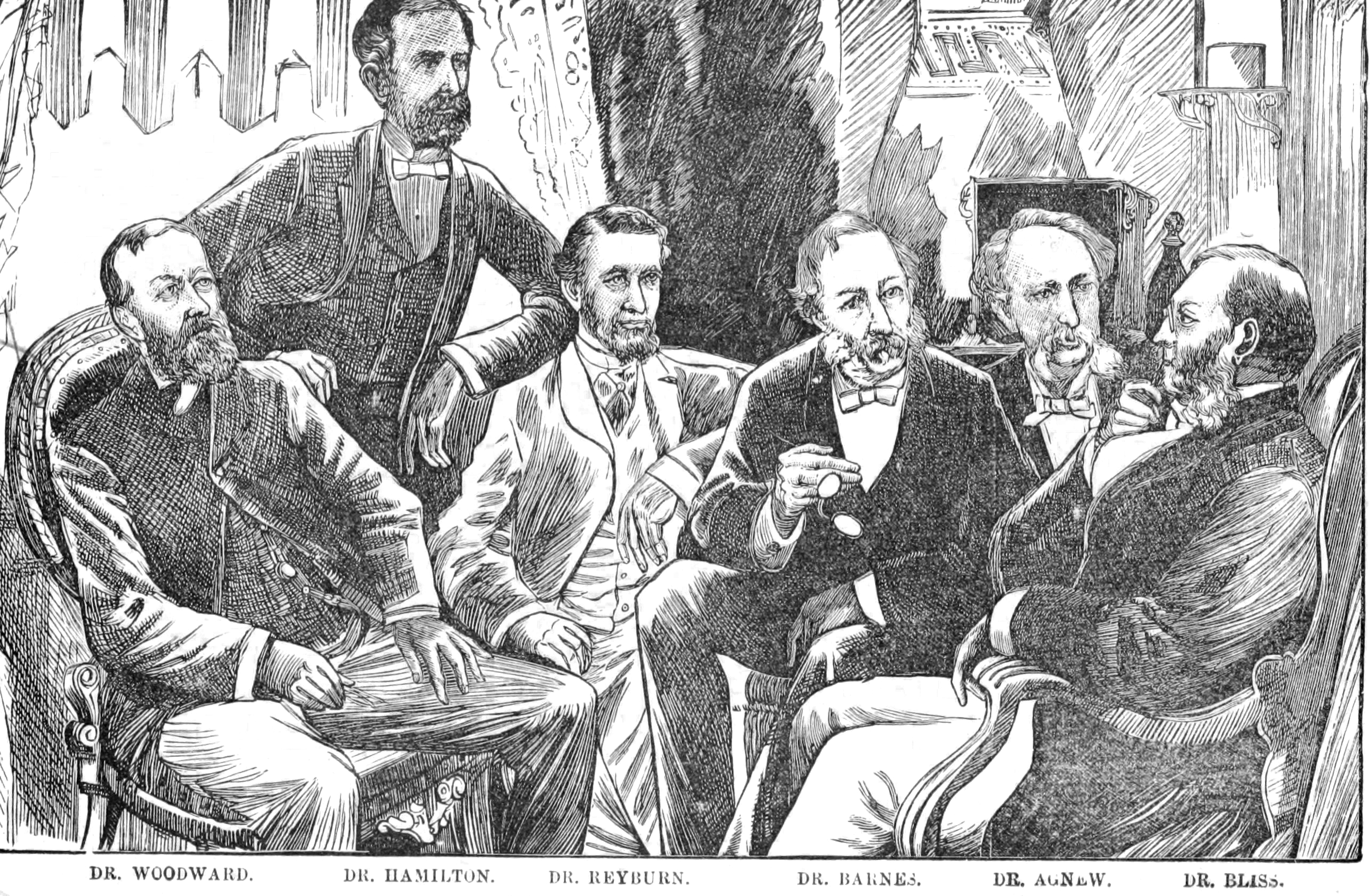
Agnew and other doctors consulting on the treatment of President James A. Garfield

Agnew was the chief surgeon in attendance after the shooting of President James A. Garfield. He performed several operations on Garfield to attempt to remove the assassins bullet and prevent infection but the surgeries were unsuccessful.

He published 100 journal articles and several publications on surgery including The Principles and Practice of Surgery, which covered his medical experience of fifty years.

== The Agnew Clinic ==
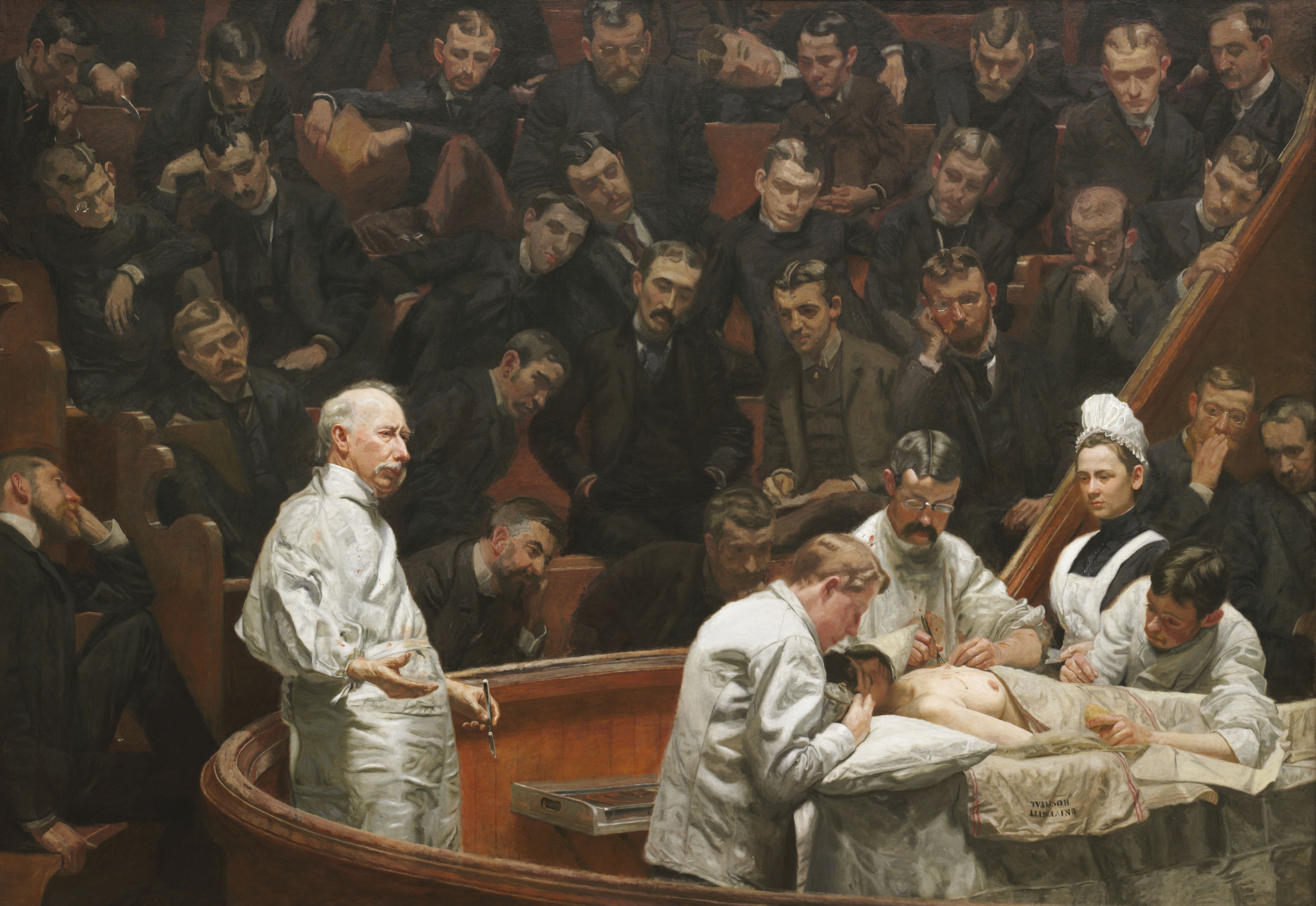
The Agnew Clinic painting by Thomas Eakins was commissioned to commemorate Agnew's retirement from the University of Pennsylvania

To honor his retirement from teaching, the 1889 graduates from the University of Pennsylvania medical school commissioned Thomas Eakins to paint The Agnew Clinic. The painting was completed in three months and presented to Agnew at that year's graduation ceremonies. The 11 by 7 foot canvas depicts Agnew lecturing an amphitheater full of medical students on a surgery he just performed.

== Death and legacy ==
Agnew suffered a severe attack of influenza in 1890 and never fully recovered. By March 9, 1892, he was bed-ridden for a series of medical problems. On March 20, he fell into a coma and died on March 22, 1892. He was interred at West Laurel Hill Cemetery in Bala Cynwyd, Pennsylvania.

Although he was not a member of the American Anthropometric Society, the organization requested that his brain be donated to their collection after his death. His wife was opposed to the request and did not provide consent.

He left $68,000 to various charitable organizations. Three D. Hayes Agnew Funds were established to provide support for sick children, for the University of Pennsylvania hospital, and for support of maternity care.

The D. Hayes Agnew Surgical Pavilion at the University of Pennsylvania medical center was named in his honor.

== Personal life ==
He married Margaret Creighton Irwin on November 21, 1841. He was an abolitionist and a member of the American Colonization Society.
