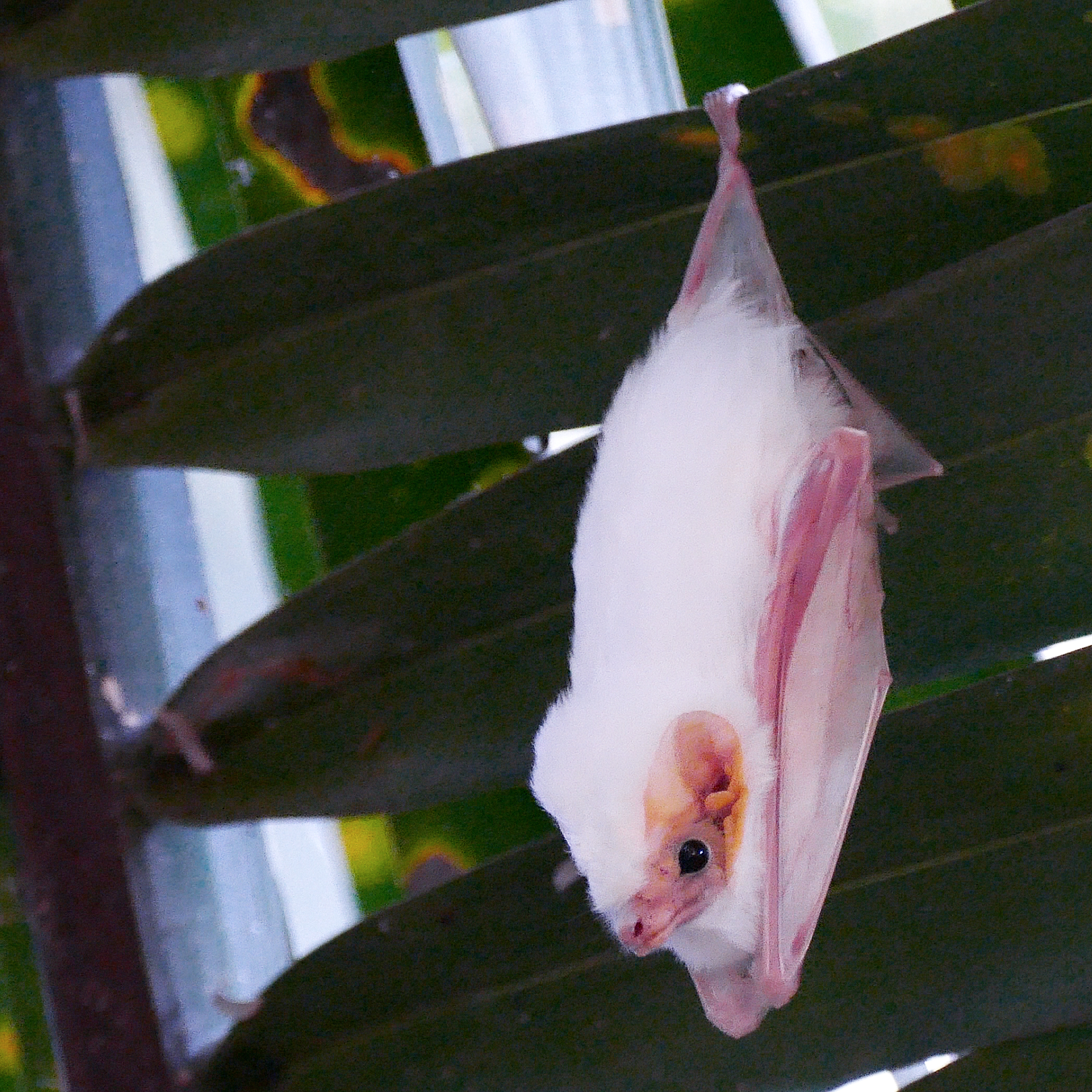
- Northern ghost bat (Diclidurus albus)

Scientific classification
- Domain: Eukaryota
- Kingdom: Animalia
- Phylum: Chordata
- Class: Mammalia
- Order: Chiroptera
- Family: Emballonuridae
- Genus: Diclidurus; Wied-Neuwied, 1819

Type species
- Diclidurus albus Wied-Neuwied, 1820

Species
- Diclidurus albus; Diclidurus ingens; Diclidurus isabella; Diclidurus scutatus

= Diclidurus =

Genus of bats

Diclidurus is a genus of bats whose common name is the ghost bats (not to be confused with the Australia Macroderma gigas). Diclidurus all inhabit tropical South America, and D. albus is also found in Mexico and Central America. The fur of these insectivorous bats is white, sometimes with a slight greyish tinge, except D. isabella, which is partially pale brown. The only other all-white bat in the New World is the Honduran white bat, but it is easily distinguished from Diclidurus by its relatively large nose leaf. Diclidurus are poorly known and only infrequently captured, at least in part because they fly high above the ground or in the forest canopy (above the typical height of mist nets used by bat researchers).

== Species ==
- Northern ghost bat—D. albus
- Greater ghost bat—D. ingens
- Isabelle's ghost bat—D. isabella
- Lesser ghost bat—D. scutatus
