= Harrison Allen =

American surgeon, anatomist, zoologist, and educator (1841–1897)

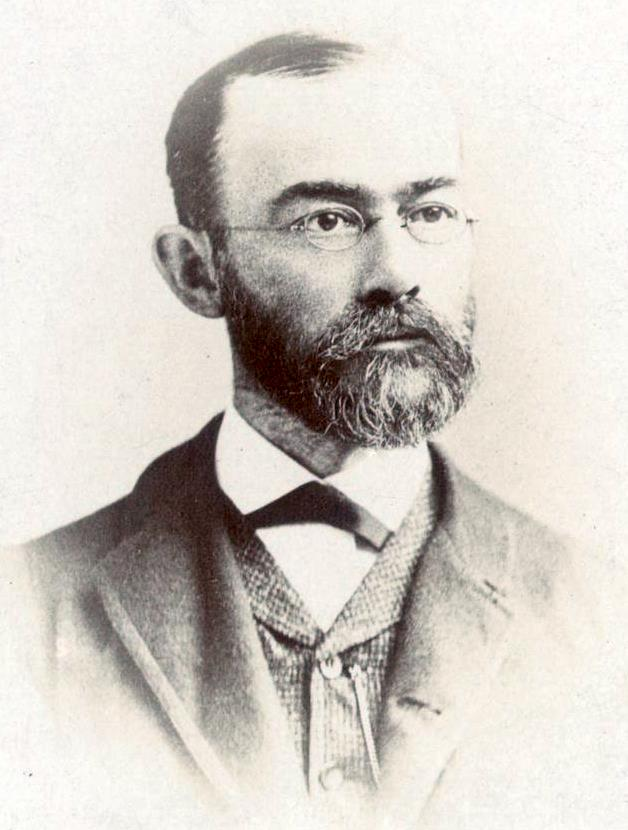
- Born: April 17, 1841; Philadelphia, Pennsylvania, U.S.
- Died: November 14, 1897 (aged 56); Philadelphia, Pennsylvania, U.S.
- Resting place: West Laurel Hill Cemetery, Bala Cynwyd, Pennsylvania, U.S.
- Education: University of Pennsylvania School of Medicine
- Medical career
- Profession: anatomist, surgeon, professor, zoologist
- Institutions: Blockley Hospital; Philadelphia Dental College; University of Pennsylvania; Wills Eye Hospital

Harrison Allen (April 17, 1841 – November 14, 1897) was an American surgeon, anatomist, zoologist, and educator. He served as a surgeon in the United States Army during the American Civil War and at several Philadelphia hospitals including Wills Eye Hospital, St. Joseph's Hospital, and Philadelphia General Hospital.

He held multiple academic positions at the University of Pennsylvania including professor of comparative anatomy and zoology; chair of the institute of medicine; emeritus professor of the institute of medicine; and chair of comparative anatomy and zoology. He was professor of anatomy and surgery at Philadelphia Dental College. He published almost 30 papers related to bats and many other papers on human anatomy and craniology. He served as president of the American Laryngological Association in 1886; the American Society of Naturalists from 1887 to 1888; and the Association of American Anatomists from 1891 to 1893

== Early life and education ==
Allen was born in Philadelphia, Pennsylvania, on April 17, 1841, to Elizabeth Justice Thomas and Samuel Allen. He was educated at local grammar schools and Central High School in Philadelphia. He studied dentistry and graduated from the medical department of the University of Pennsylvania in 1861. After graduation he worked as a resident physician at Blockley Hospital in Philadelphia.

In 1862, he served as a surgeon in the United States Army during the Civil War. He was deployed to Washington D.C. hospitals which allowed him to visit the Smithsonian Institution in his spare time where he became acquainted with Joseph Henry and Spencer Fullerton Baird. He resigned from the United States Army on December 8, 1865, at the rank of brevet major.

== Career ==
He began the practice of medicine in Philadelphia, and due to his dentistry background, he focused on surgery of the air passages. He was greatly influenced by his instructor Joseph Leidy and joined other scientists at the Philadelphia School of Anatomy and the Philadelphia Academy of Natural Sciences.

In 1865 he was made professor of comparative anatomy and zoology in the auxiliary medical department at the University of Pennsylvania. He was made chair of the institute of medicine in 1878; emeritus professor of the institute of medicine in 1885; and chair of comparative anatomy and zoology from 1891 to 1895. He was professor of anatomy and surgery at Philadelphia Dental College from 1866 to 1878.

He worked as an assistant surgeon at Wills Eye Hospital from 1868 to 1870 and at St. Joseph's Hospital from 1870 to 1878. He worked as a visiting surgeon at Philadelphia Hospital from 1874 to 1878.

He published almost 30 papers related to bats, including his Monograph on the Bats of North America published by the Smithsonian Institution in 1864 and revised in 1893. He published multiple other articles on human anatomy including the joints and muscles. He published several papers on craniology including Crania from the Florida Mounds and Hawaiian Skulls which attempted to correlate race with skull shape. He was the first to use the term pedomorphism to describe the retention of childish features in adults.

In 1867, he was elected as a member to the American Philosophical Society.

Allen served as president of the American Laryngological Association in 1886 and of the American Society of Naturalists from 1887 to 1888. He was a founding member of the American Anthropometric Society. He served as president of the Association of American Anatomists from 1891 to 1893. He was the curator of the Wistar Institute of Anatomy.

== Death and legacy ==
He suffered from angina and died on November 14, 1897. He was interred at West Laurel Hill Cemetery, Lansdowne Section, Lot 205, in Bala Cynwyd, Pennsylvania. After his death, his brain was donated to the American Anthropometric Society. In 1907, Edward Anthony Spitzka published a paper of his analysis of six brains at the American Anthropometric Society, including Allen's.

His personal collection of bats and other specimens was donated to the Philadelphia Academy of Natural Sciences.

== Personal life ==
On December 29, 1869, he married Julia A. Colton and together they had two children.

== Publications ==
- Outlines of Comparative Anatomy and Medical Zoology, Philadelphia: J.B. Lippincott & Co., 1869
- Studies in the Facial Region, Philadelphia: J.B. Lippincott & Co., 1875
- An Analysis of the Life Form in Art, Philadelphia: McCalla & Stavely, Printers, 1875
- A System of Human Anatomy Including Its Medical and Surgical Relations, Philadelphia: Henry C. Lea's Son & Co., 1884
- On A New Method of Recording The Motions of the Soft Palate, Philadelphia: P. Blakiston, Son & Co., 1884
- A Clinical Study of the Skull, Washington: Smithsonian Institution, 1890
- Description of Two New Species of Bats Nyctinomous Europs and N. Orthotis, Washington: Smithsonian Institution, 1890
- On a New Subfamily of Phyllostome Bats, Washington: Smithsonian Institution, 1892
- A Monograph of the Bats of North America, Washington: Smithsonian Institution, 1893
- Two Scientific Worthies, Popular Science Monthly, Volume 50, November 1896
