= William Pepper =

American physician and Provost of the University of Pennsylvania (1843-1898)

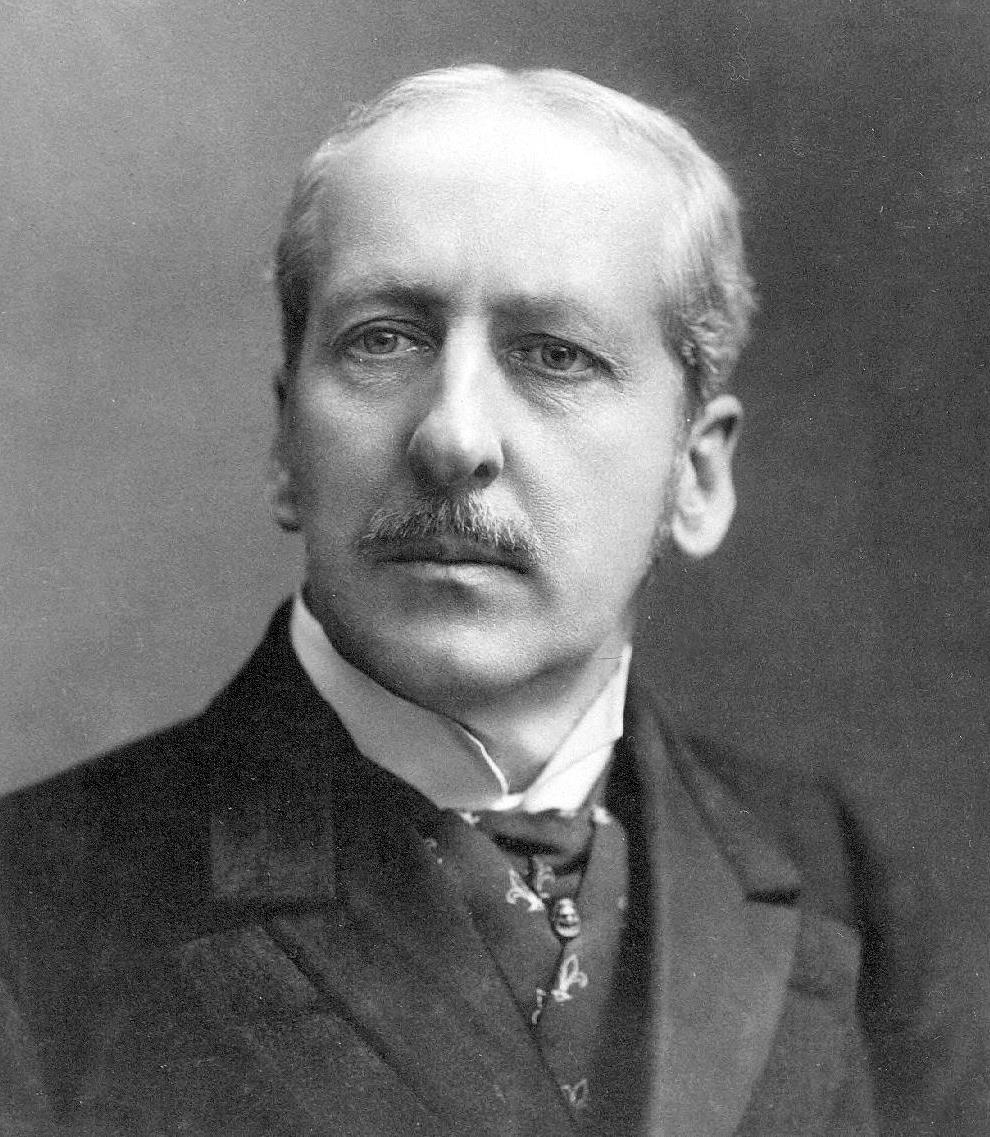
- Born: August 21, 1843; Philadelphia, Pennsylvania, U.S.
- Died: July 28, 1898 (aged 54); Pleasanton, California, U.S.
- Resting place: Laurel Hill Cemetery, Philadelphia, Pennsylvania, U.S.
- Education: University of Pennsylvania
- Known for: Neuroblastoma
- Scientific career
- Fields: Medicine

William Pepper Jr. (August 21, 1843 – July 28, 1898), was an American physician and medical educator, and the eleventh provost of the University of Pennsylvania, from 1881 to 1894. He was an advocate for the establishment of a university affiliated hospital and led the finance and building committees for the construction of the University of Pennsylvania Hospital in 1874. As provost, he oversaw a major expansion of the University including the construction of 13 campus buildings, the addition of the Wharton School of Business, and eleven new departments. In 1891, he founded the Free Library of Philadelphia.

== Early life and education ==
Pepper was born in Philadelphia to Dr. William Pepper Sr. and Sarah Platt. He was educated at the University of Pennsylvania and graduated with a Bachelor's degree as valedictorian in 1862 and from the medical school in 1864.

He received a LL.D. degree from Lafayette College in 1881 and from the University of Pennsylvania in 1893.

== Career ==
Pepper worked as an apothecary and a resident physician at Pennsylvania Hospital. He was appointed pathologist at Pennsylvania hospital in 1866, visiting physician at the Blockley Almshouse, and curator of the Philadelphia hospital after the resignation of David Hayes Agnew.

In 1868 Pepper became lecturer on morbid anatomy at the University of Pennsylvania School of Medicine. He lectured on clinical medicine from 1870 to 1874 and on physical diagnosis from 1871 to 1873. From 1876 to 1887, he was professor of clinical medicine at Penn and in 1887 succeeded Dr Alfred Stillé as professor of theory and practice of medicine.

Pepper founded the Philadelphia Medical Times and was editor of that journal in 1870 and 1871. He was an advocate for the establishment of a university hospital and was named chairman of the finance committee. Through his efforts, a site was selected and money for building and an endowment were established in May 1872. He was named chairman of the building committee and The University of Pennsylvania Hospital construction was completed in July 1874.

He was elected the eleventh provost of the University of Pennsylvania in 1881 and remained in that position until 1894. He oversaw the growth of Penn into a modern university. Under his leadership the school grew from 42 faculty members, 1,044 students in 5 schools to 245 faculty members, 2,680 students in 9 schools. He implemented the Wharton School of Business and the Graduate School of Arts and Science.

He oversaw the construction of thirteen new buildings on campus and the creation of twelve new departments including:

- The Department of Archaeology & Paleontology
- The Department of Biology
- The Department of Finance and Economy
- The Department of Hygiene
- The Department of Philosophy
- The Department of Physical Education
- The Graduate Department for Women
- The School for Nurses in the University Hospital
- The School of Architecture
- The Veterinary Hospital
- The Wistar Institute of Anatomy and Biology

He was an advocate for the sponsorship of original scientific research at the University of Pennsylvania. He established the Library of Hygiene in 1892 and partially funded the Laboratory of Clinical Medicine which was named The William Pepper Laboratory of Clinical Medicine in honor of his father.

In 1893, Pepper was part of the executive committee for the first Pan-American Medical Congress. For his services as medical director of the United States Centennial Exhibition at Philadelphia in 1876, he was made Knight Commander of Saint Olaf by King Oscar II of Sweden.

Pepper was the founder of Philadelphia's first free public library, chartered in 1891 through funds provided by the estate of his late uncle, which became the Free Library of Philadelphia, today the city's multi-branch public library system. He founded the University of Pennsylvania Archaeological Museum in 1887 and the Wistar Institute in 1894. He sponsored the Pepper-Hearst expedition (1895–1897) on the Gulf coast of Florida, near Tarpon Springs. He was a member of the American Philosophical Society, a founding member of the Philobiblon Club in 1893, and a fellow in the College of Physicians.

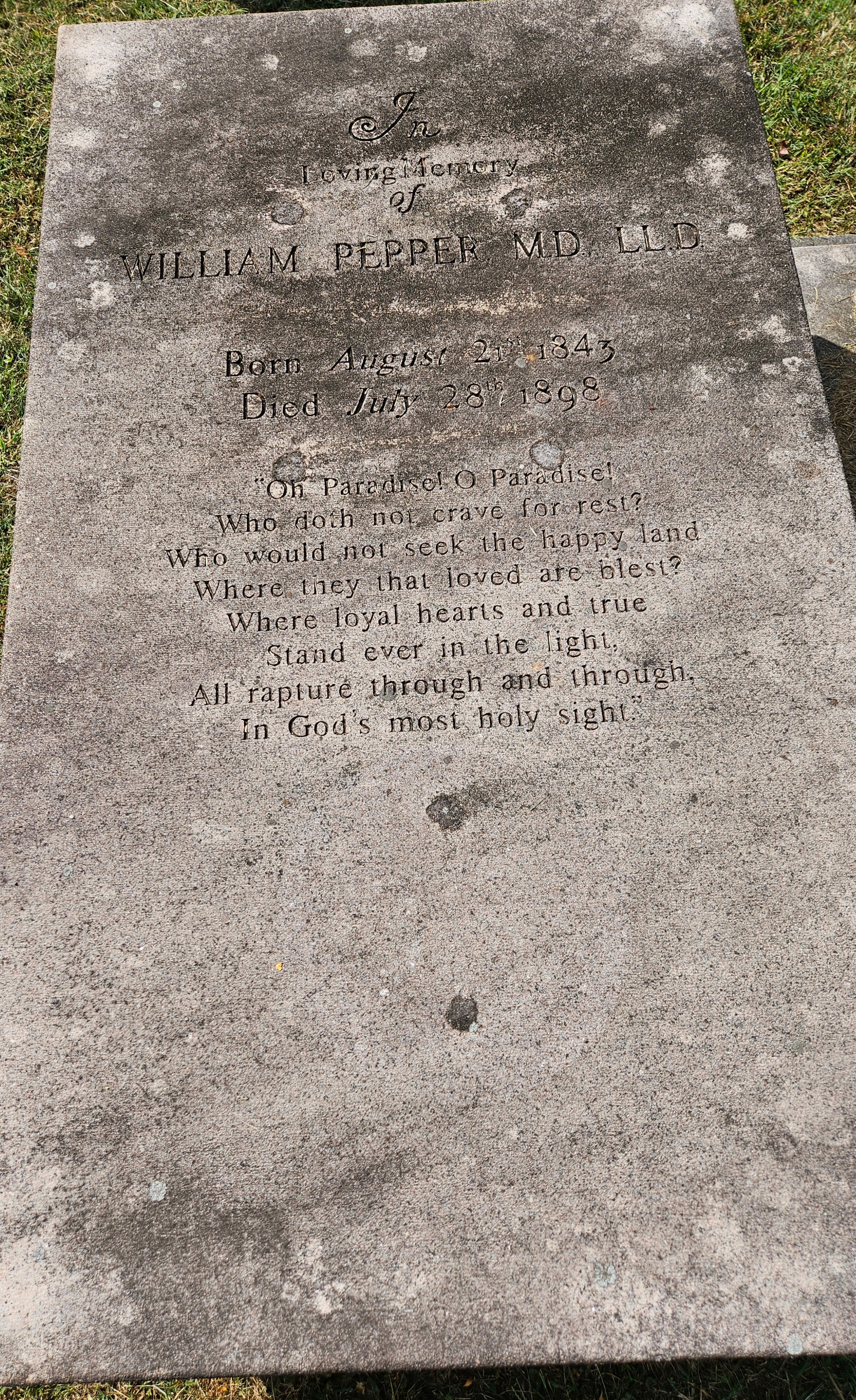
William Pepper tombstone in Laurel Hill Cemetery

Pepper was known academically for his contributions to the theory and practice of medicine and the System of Medicine that he edited in 1885-86 became one of America's standard medical textbooks. He died of heart disease while traveling in Pleasanton, California, on July 28, 1898. His body was returned to Philadelphia where he was cremated and his ashes interred at Laurel Hill Cemetery in Philadelphia.

== Personal life ==
He married Frances Sergent Perry, the granddaughter of Oliver Hazard Perry, in 1873 and together they had three children.

== Legacy ==
After his death, by request in his will, his brain was donated to the American Anthropometric Society. In 1907, Edward Anthony Spitzka published a paper of his analysis of six brains at the American Anthropometric Society, including Pepper's.

A bronze statue of Pepper by Karl Bitter stands on the south side of College Hall at the University of Pennsylvania. A replica of this stands on the landing of the main staircase of the Free Library of Philadelphia. In addition, a marble bust - also by Bitter - rests on a wooden base in the Edwin A. Fleisher Collection of Orchestral Music at the Free Library of Philadelphia.

A plaque to his memory is in the second floor atrium at the Perelman Center for Advanced Medicine at Penn Medicine.

== Publications ==
- A Practical Treatise on the Diseases of Children, Philadelphia: Lindsay & Blakiston, 1870
- The University in Modern Life, an Address Delivered Before the College Association of the Middle States and of Maryland at its Annual Meeting at the University of Pennsylvania, November, 1889., 1890

His contributions to the medical and scientific journals of the day included the following:

- Trephining in Cerebral Disease (1871)
- Local Treatment in Pulmonary Cavities (1874)
- Catarrhal Irrigation (1881)
- Epilepsy (1883)
- Higher Medical Education: the True Interest of the Public and the Profession.

== Gallery ==
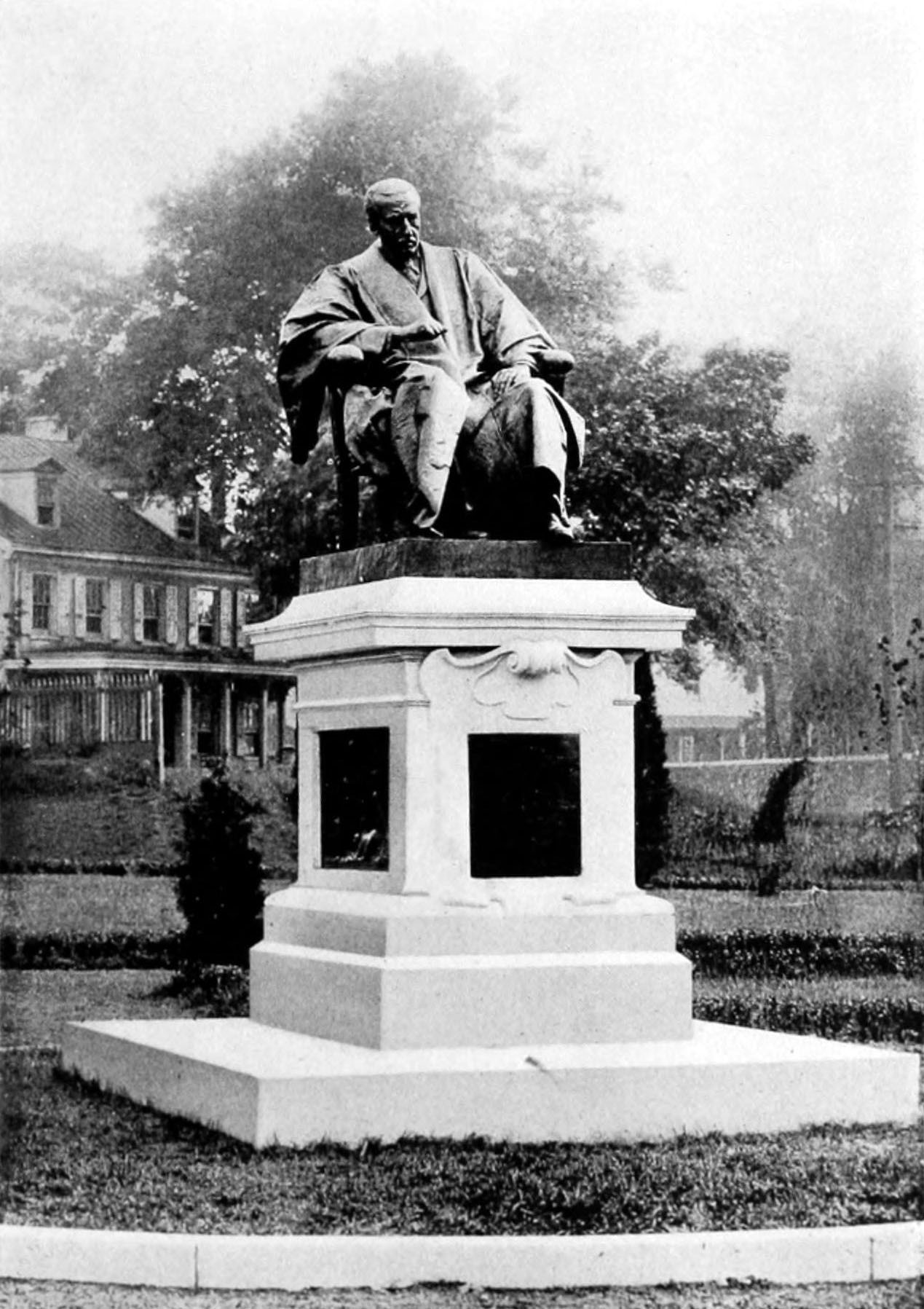
Dr. William Pepper by Karl Bitter (1896), University of Pennsylvania

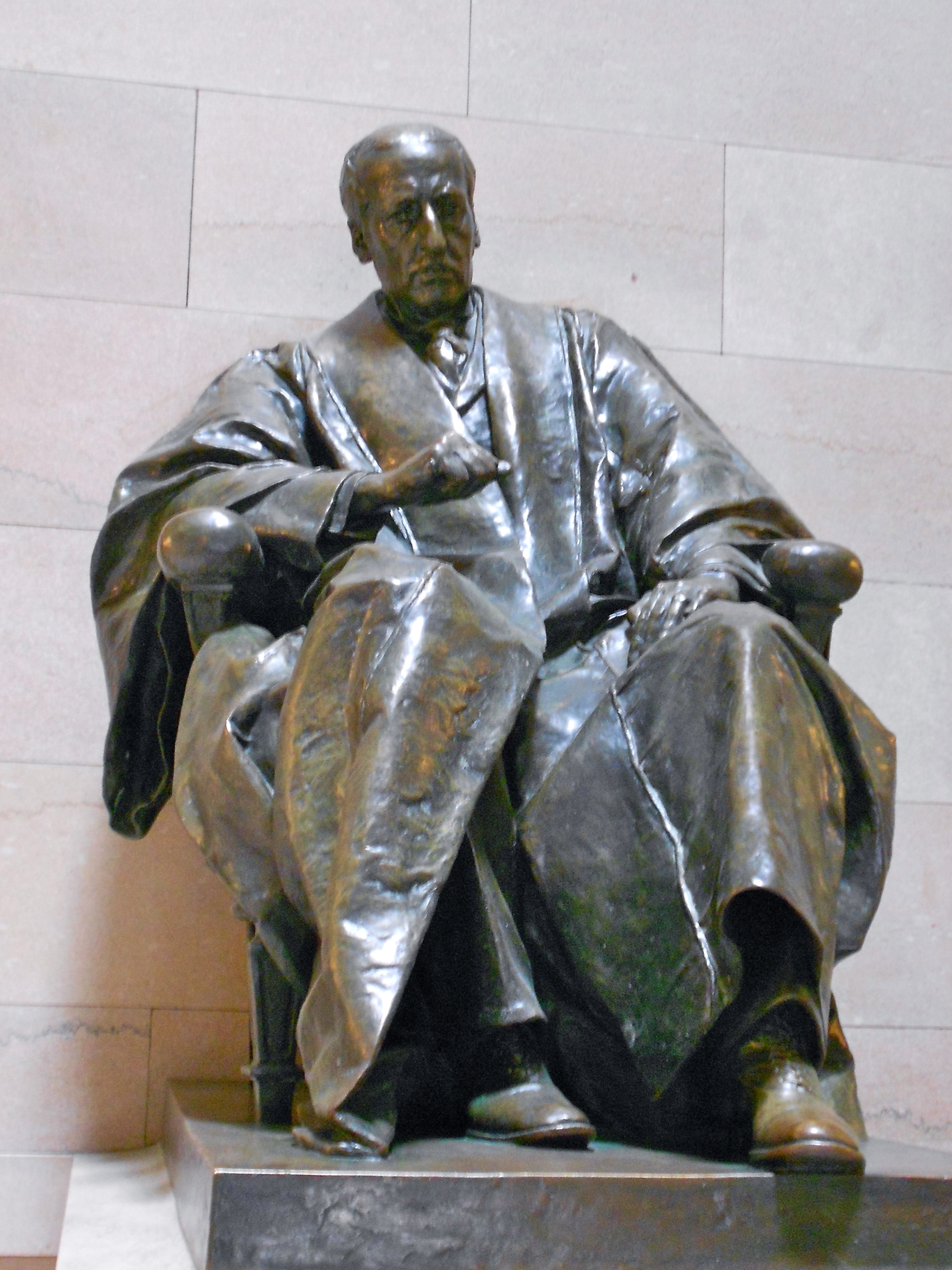
Dr. William Pepper by Karl Bitter (1896, this casting 1899), Free Library of Philadelphia

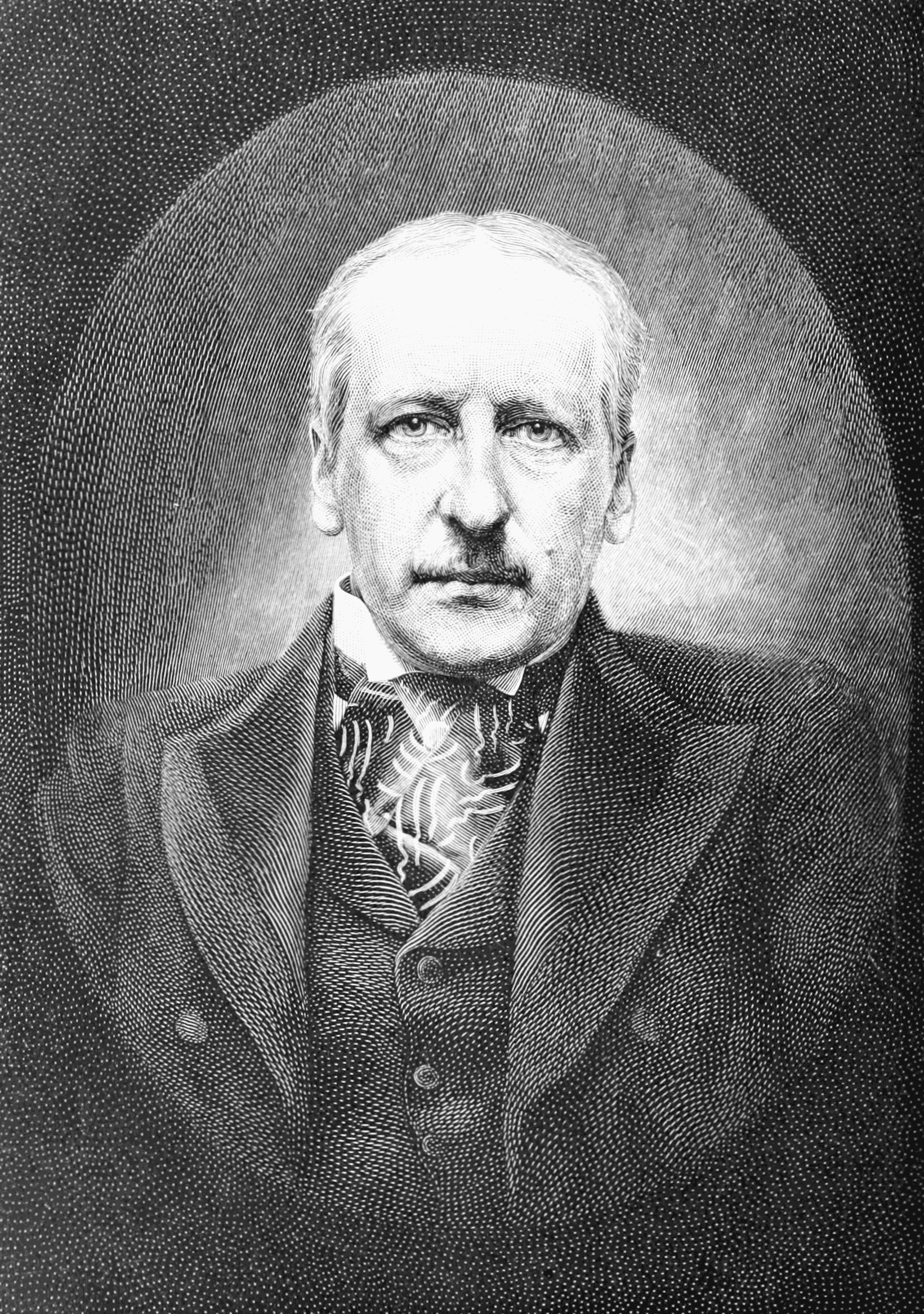
Engraved portrait of Dr. William Pepper

Academic offices
Preceded by Charles Janeway Stillé	Provost of the University of Pennsylvania; 1881–1894	Succeeded by Charles Custis Harrison
