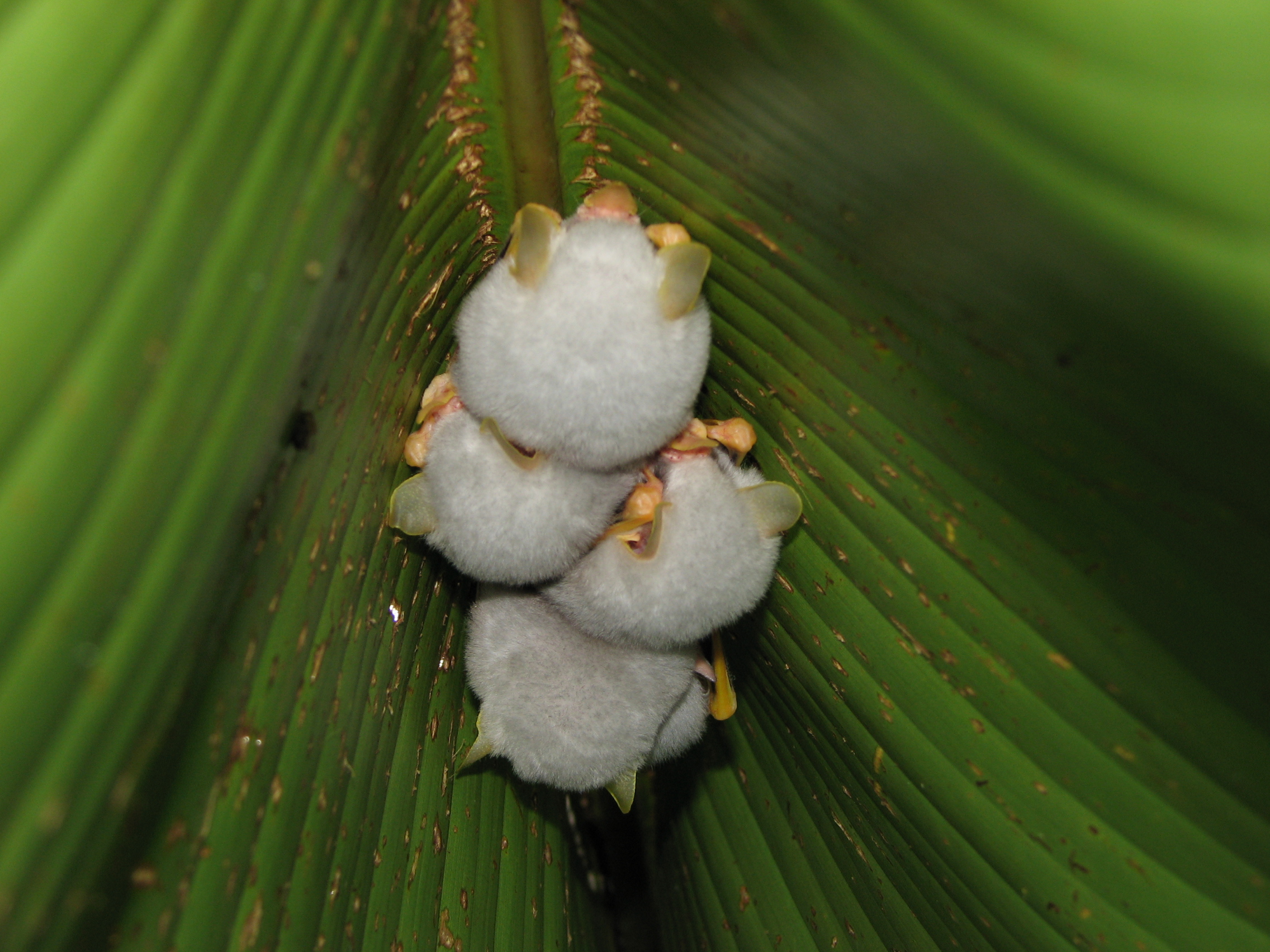
- A roosting colony (Costa Rica)

Conservation status
- Near Threatened (IUCN 3.1)

Scientific classification
- Kingdom: Animalia
- Phylum: Chordata
- Class: Mammalia
- Order: Chiroptera
- Family: Phyllostomidae
- Genus: Ectophylla; H. Allen, 1892
- Species: E. alba

Binomial name
- Ectophylla alba H. Allen, 1892
- Range map of the species

= Honduran white bat =

Species of bat that constructs tents

The Honduran white bat (Ectophylla alba), also called the Caribbean white tent-making bat, is a species of bat in the family Phyllostomidae. It is the only member of the genus Ectophylla. The genus and the species were both scientifically described for the first time in 1892. It has distinctive, entirely white fur, which is only found in six of the roughly 1,300 known species of bat. It constructs "tents" out of understory plant leaves by strategically cutting the leaf ribs with its teeth; it roosts in these tents during the day. It is a specialist frugivore, consuming almost exclusively the fruits of one species of fig. Females can likely become pregnant twice per year, giving birth to one offspring at a time.

It is found in Honduras, Nicaragua, Costa Rica and western Panama at elevations from sea level to 700 m (2,300 ft). Due to habitat loss, it is evaluated as near-threatened by the IUCN. Its bright yellow ears, nose-leaf, and lips are a result of carotenoid deposition; the mechanism of this deposition is being researched as a way to understand and combat macular degeneration in humans.

== Taxonomy and phylogeny ==
- - - Ectophylla
    - Mesophylla
  - - Vampyressa
    - Chiroderma

Ectophylla relative to other genera

The Honduran white bat was described as a new species, Ectophylla alba, in 1892 by American zoologist Harrison Allen. The holotype that Allen used to describe the new genus and species was collected by Charles Haskins Townsend near the Coco River in Honduras in 1887. It belongs to the leaf-nosed bat family, Phyllostomidae. Within Phyllostomidae, it is in the subfamily Stenodermatinae. MacConnell's bat was once included in the genus Ectophylla, but it is now monotypic within Mesophylla. Despite no longer being classified in the same genus, MacConnell's bat and the Honduran white bat are sister taxa—they are each other's closest relative. The Honduran white bat is the only member of Ectophylla, meaning it is a monotypic genus. The genus name "Ectophylla" is from Ancient Greek "ektós" meaning "out" and "phúllon" meaning "leaf", referring to its nose-leaf. Its species name "alba" comes from Latin "albus" meaning "white".

== Description ==
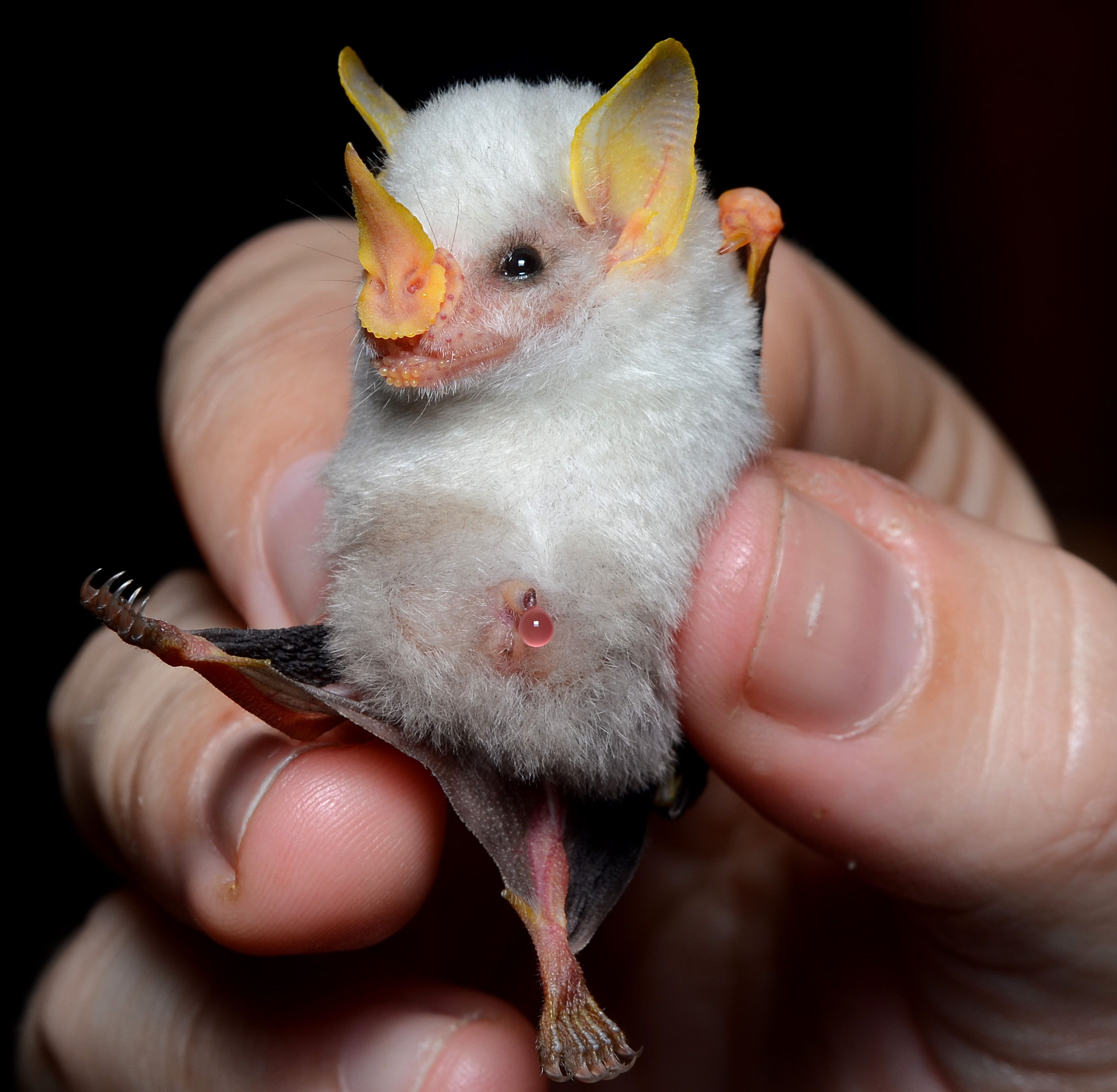
Individual captured via mist net (Costa Rica)

Like both its common name and specific epithet suggest, the Honduran white bat has bright white fur. The tips of individual hairs are gray, with the grayish coloration more pronounced towards the bat's posterior. This species, along with four Diclidurus species and the ghost bat (Macroderma gigas), is among the only currently known species of bat—more than 1,300 species have been described—where the pelage is all white. Its large nose-leaf easily distinguishes it from the northern ghost bat (Diclidurus albus), however, which is the only white bat with which it is sympatric (having an overlapping geographic range). Its wing membranes are black. Its ears, tragi (the cartilaginous projections in front of the ear openings), nose-leaf, and lips are a bright, yellowish orange. Its yellow-orange pigmentation is due to large concentrations of carotenoids, particularly xanthophyll. It is the first mammal known to have enough carotenoids in its skin to generate conspicuous color.

A 2019 study found that while the brightness of the yellow pigment of the ears did not vary significantly between adults and juveniles, the yellow chroma (colorfulness relative to brightness) of the ears did differ with age. Adult bats had higher yellow chroma in their ears than did juveniles. The yellow of the nose-leaf, however, had more variation. Adult males' nose-leaves are a brighter yellow than those of adult females; juveniles of each sex did not differ in nose-leaf brightness. Adult males also had significantly brighter nose-leaves than juvenile males. Similarly to the ears, the yellow chroma of the nose-leaf was greater in adults than in juveniles, though not different between the sexes. The authors suggested that the color difference of male and female nose-leaves is indicative of sexual dichromatism, meaning that females may select for males with brighter nose-leaves. This conclusion was supported by the trend that males with brighter yellow nose-leaves tended to have better body conditions. Females could thus use nose-leaf color as an honest signal of male fitness when selecting a mate.

Another 2019 study found that the distinctive yellow pigment may have been selected for as a result of the bat's tent-roosting. Reconstructions of ancestral states showed that the yellow coloration coevolved with tent-roosting. As sunlight passes through the green leaves of the tents, it results in a yellowish light; any bats with yellowish coloration would have had more effective camouflage, and thus be more likely to survive, reproduce, and pass on these genes to their offspring.

It is a small species, with a head and body length of 37–47 mm (1.5–1.9 in), a forearm length of 27.8–29.3 mm (1.09–1.15 in), and an ear length of 10–15 mm (0.39–0.59 in). Individuals weigh only 5–6 g (0.18–0.21 oz). The bat's nose-leaf is erect, its tail is absent, and its ears large and rounded. The inner margin of the tragus is convex, while the outer margin is coarsely serrated with four or five small lobes. The nose-leaf also has a serrated margin. It has eight to ten small "warts" under its mouth. Its dental formula is 2.1.2.22.1.2.2, for a total of 28 teeth. Its skull is similar in appearance to other species in its subfamily, with the exception of its very deep basioccipital pits. The bat overall resembles a small, white Platyrrhinus.

== Biology and ecology ==
=== Tent-making ===
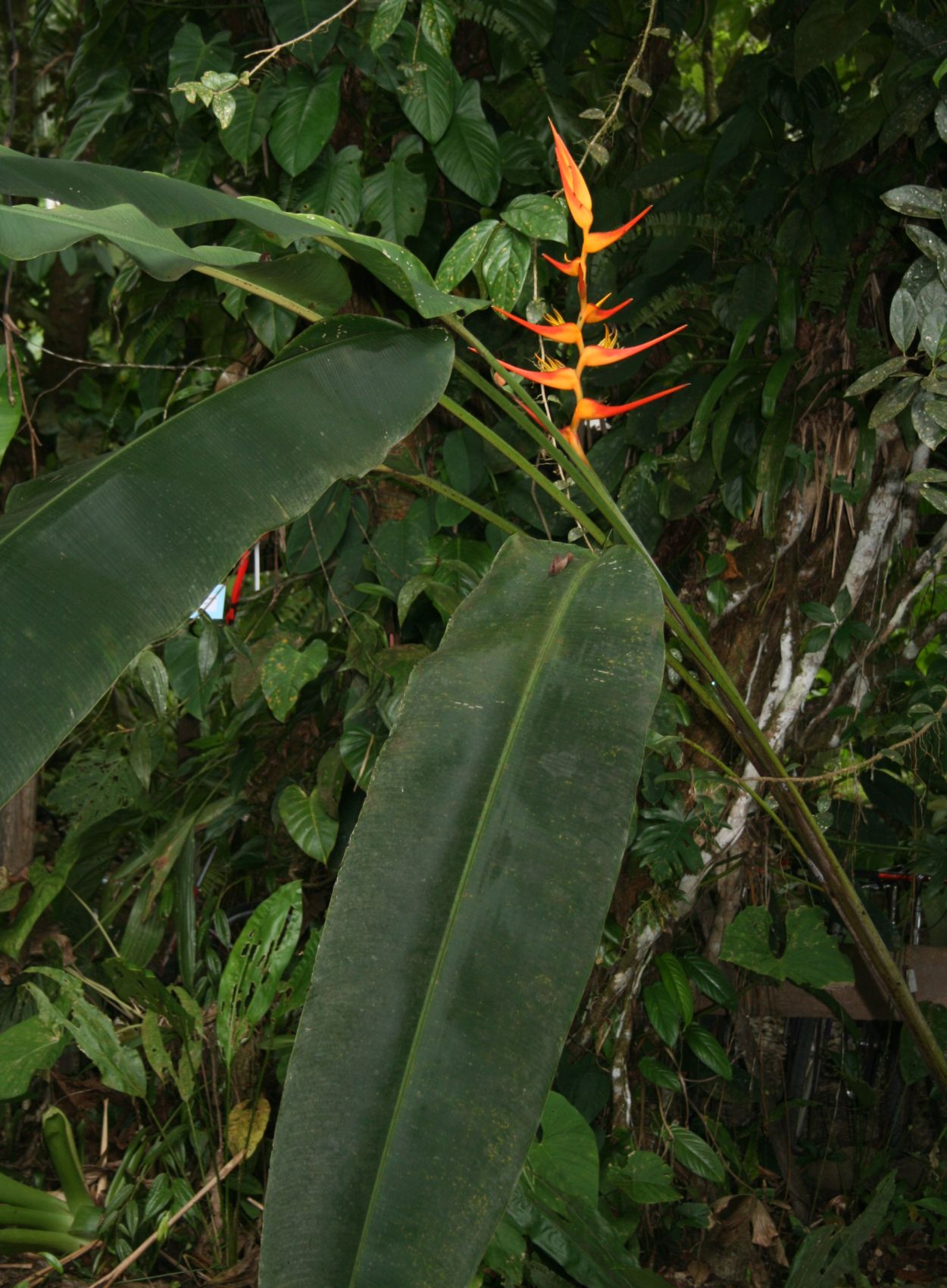
Heliconia latispatha, which is a plant species used for tent roosting (Costa Rica)

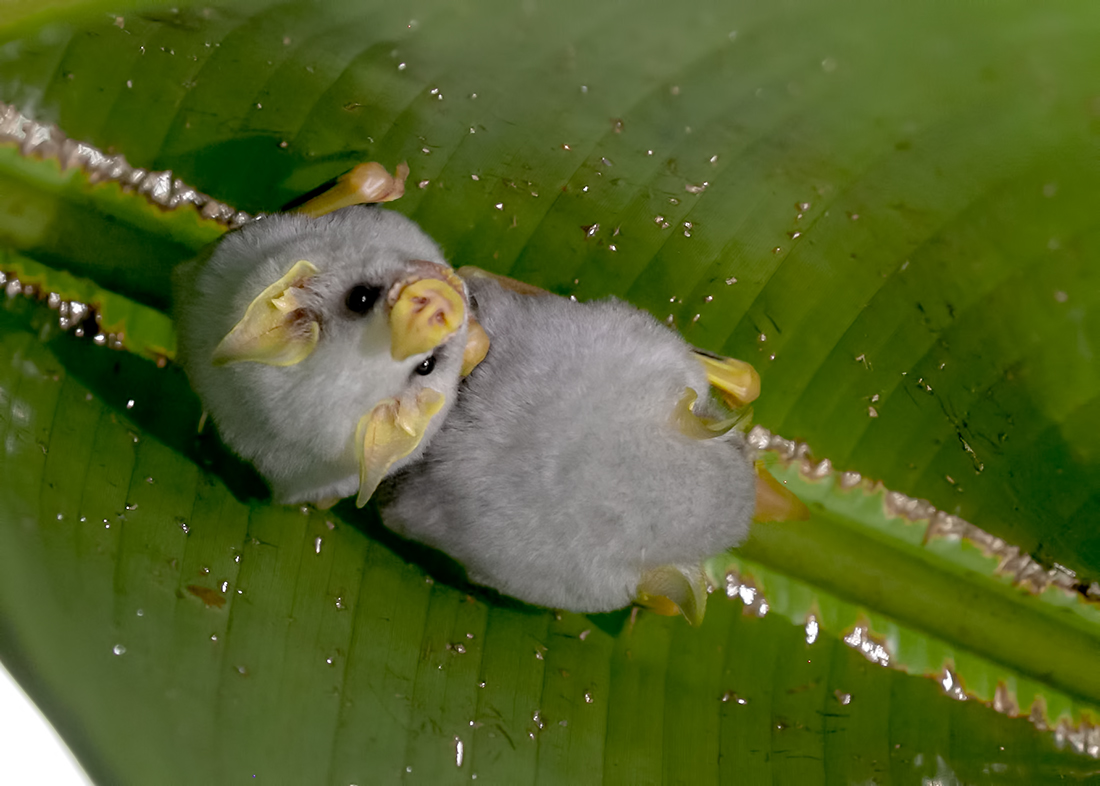
Bats in a tent

The Honduran white bat is one of approximately 22 known species of bats that roost within leaf "tents". The Honduran white bat cuts the side veins extending out from the midrib of the large leaves of the Heliconia plant causing them to fold down to form a tent. Tents are likely constructed by multiple individuals; females have been observed constructing tents, but it is likely that males do so as well. New tents are constructed throughout the year, as modifying the leaves into tents causes the leaves to die. Once modified into a tent, a leaf lives approximately 7.5 weeks, compared to 61 weeks in an unmodified leaf. Several species of Heliconia are used as roosts, including H. imbricata, H. latispatha, H. pogonantha, H. tortuosa, and H. sarapiquensis. Rarely, it has been documented using Calathea and Ischnosiphon inflatus plants as roosts. In selecting leaves to turn into tents, it appears that the age and size of the leaf is more important than the species of plant. Preferred leaves are 0.8–1.2 m (2.6–3.9 ft) long and less than 30 days old. Younger leaves may be preferred because they are easier to bite through and shape than older leaves. It also prefers leaves that are less than 2 m (6.6 ft) above the forest floor. Preferred leaves are in areas of low understory vegetation density, but high canopy vegetation density. Heliconia density is lower surrounding chosen leaves than would be expected if the bats selected leaves randomly. Features such as canopy density may help the tent maintain a consistent microclimate. Tents are usually 23.3 °C (73.9 °F), with little fluctuation. High canopy density could also protect its tent from disturbance from wind and rain. Because tent construction takes up to several weeks' worth of time from several individuals, choosing more sheltered tents could prolong the life of a tent and protect the bats' investment. Low understory vegetation density is thought to be beneficial by providing an uncluttered airspace for the bats as they exit and enter their tents.

It clings to the roof of its tent in small colonies of 1-15 individuals. The tent protects it from rain and predators. Rather than roosting in a single tent consistently, the Honduran white bat has a network of tents scattered across the forest; it alternates among these tents for roosting. Single tents have been consistently occupied for up to 45 days. Although their tents are typically low to the ground, sunlight filters through the leaf which gives their white fur a greenish cast. This almost completely conceals them if they remain still. Alternately, it has been proposed that its white fur gives it the appearance of a wasp nest, which would be avoided by predators. It likely has several predators, including capuchin monkeys, Central American squirrel monkeys, and snakes.

=== Diet and foraging ===
The Honduran white bat is frugivorous. Along with the little white-shouldered bat, the Honduran white bat is one of the two smallest species of frugivorous bat in the world. It specializes on a species of fig, Ficus colubrinae. However, other species of figs are occasionally consumed, such as Ficus schippii. The Honduran white bat prefers F. colubrinae trees that are "high-quality," or produce many fruits at once. It also chooses fig trees that are the closest to its day roosts. F. colubrinae trees have asynchronous fruit production, so its fruits are available as a food source year-round. Because it is highly specialized on the one species of fig, it has larger foraging movements than observed in frugivorous bats that are less specialized. Individuals have an average home range of 63.2 ha (0.244 mi^{2}). It is unclear how it manages to survive on such a narrow diet, as it is predicted it should have to consume supplemental food sources.

=== Reproduction ===
Little is known about the Honduran white bat's reproductive behaviors. It has been proposed that individuals give birth in April and September, and that estrus occurs post-parturition. Pregnant females have been documented in February, March, June, July, and August in Costa Rica, with lactating females documented in March and April. Females have synchronized births, with all births in a colony occurring within the same week. Litter size is one offspring, called a pup. During lactation, mothers will return to their roosts up to six times a night to feed their pups. Pups fledge, or become capable of flight, at 3–4 weeks old.

== Range and habitat ==
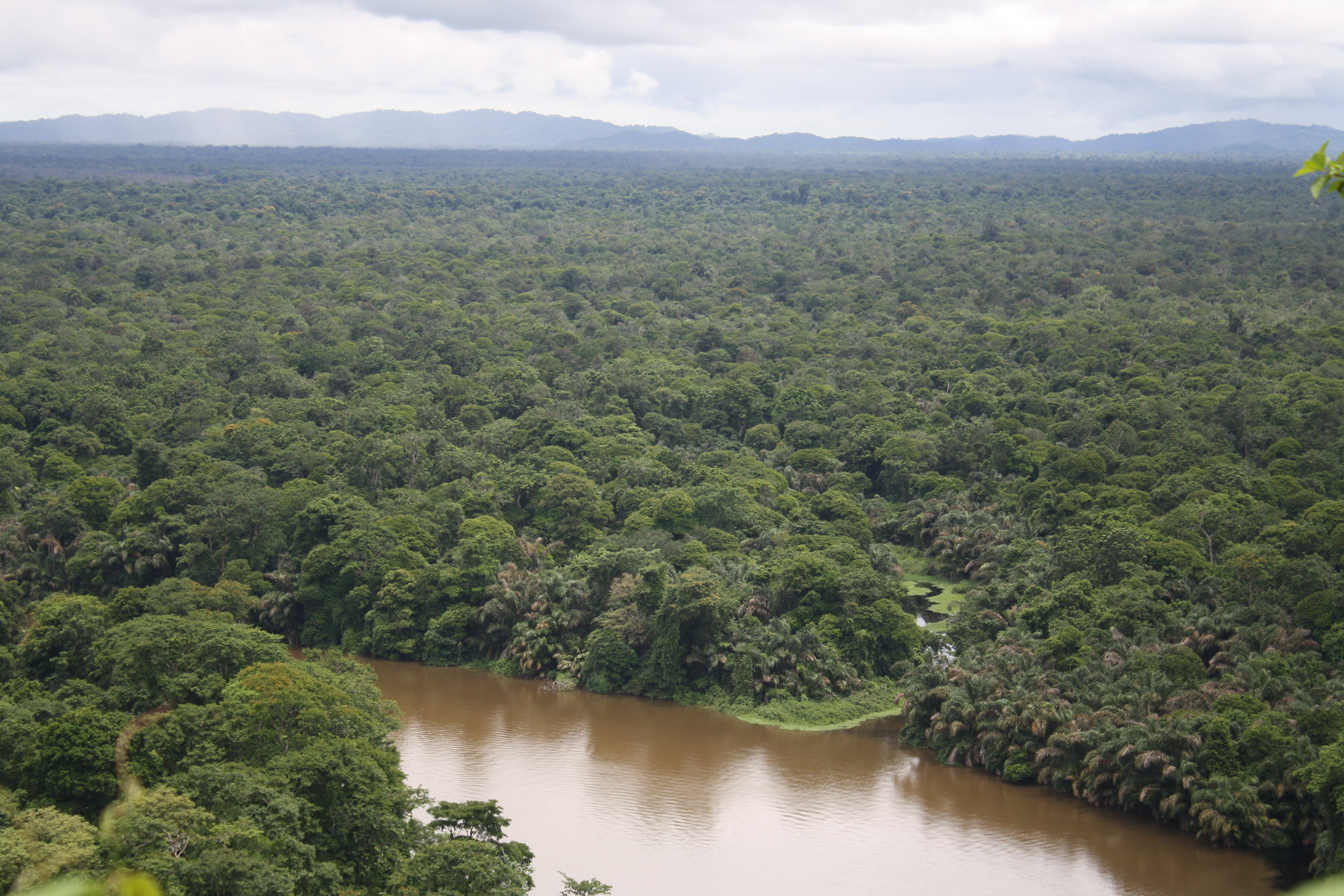
Tortuguero National Park, a location where this species is found (Costa Rica)

The Honduran white bat is found in several countries in Central America, including Costa Rica, Honduras, Nicaragua, and Panama. Unusually, it is one of only four species of leaf-nosed bat endemic to Central America; most leaf-nosed bats are found in South America. Its range spans elevations from 0 to 700 m (0 to 2,297 ft) above sea level. It prefers wet evergreen forests and secondary forests that can support its specific roosting and dietary needs.

== Conservation ==
Despite being a conspicuously colored bat, over sixty years passed between the discovery of the first Honduran white bat in 1898 and the next discovery in 1963. It is currently evaluated as near-threatened by the IUCN. It meets the criteria for this designation because its population is in a "significant decline." The decline does not exceed 30% population loss over the past three generations (approximately 18 years in this species), which would qualify it for vulnerable designation. However, it is on the verge of qualifying for the vulnerable designation. Reasons for its population decline include conversion of its habitat to farmland as well as an expanding human population. It is particularly susceptible to habitat loss because it is highly specialized on a single species of fig for its food source.

== Human health applications ==
In 2016, it was discovered that the Honduran white bat uses carotenoids to produce the yellow-orange coloration of its ears, nose-leaf, and lips. It was the first mammalian species to be documented with high enough concentrations of carotenoids to produce visible skin coloration. It isolates the pigments from its diet, particularly the fruits of the Ficus colubrinae tree. Lutein, the carotenoid responsible for its yellow pigmentation, is present in its skin in its esterified form, while in its free form in the liver. This suggests that Honduran white bats possess a physiological mechanism to convert free lutein to esterified lutein, which humans are unable to do. Lutein plays an important role in the eyes by preventing damage to the retina; it is hypothesized that if the free lutein in human eyes was esterified, it would be more effective at preventing damage and preserving vision. Understanding the process by which Honduran white bats convert free lutein to esterified lutein could assist in the understanding of how the stability and bioavailability of carotenoids benefit human health. In particular, the species may have research applications for understanding and treating macular degeneration in humans.
