= Philadelphia School of Anatomy =

Defunct medical school in Pennsylvania

Coordinates: 39°57′07″N 75°09′08″W

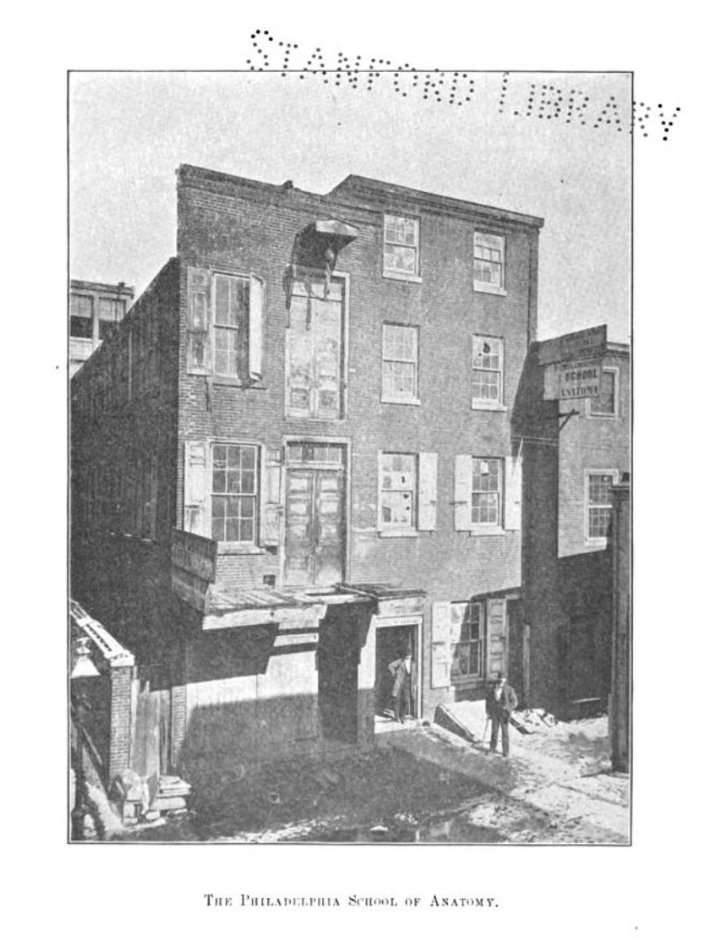
Philadelphia School of Anatomy

The Philadelphia School of Anatomy was a medical college in Philadelphia, Pennsylvania, United States, established by James McClintock in 1838 and active until 1875. The school and its predecessor, the Philadelphia Anatomical Rooms, was owned by or affiliated with several notable physicians including David Hayes Agnew, James Garretson, John Davidson Godman, William Goodell, William Williams Keen, and Joseph Pancoast.

== Philadelphia Anatomical Rooms ==
The school originated from the Philadelphia Anatomical Rooms established in 1820 by Jason Valentine O'Brien Lawrance. The University of Pennsylvania was the only medical school in Philadelphia at the time and was closed from April to November each year. The Philadelphia Anatomical Rooms were one of several private dissection rooms opened throughout the city so that students were not solely reliant on the anatomical rooms at the university and could continue their education in the summer.

After the death of Lawrance, control of the Philadelphia Anatomical Rooms passed to John Davidson Godman. Godman left for Rutgers College in 1826, and the anatomical rooms were managed by James Webster from 1826 to 1830. The anatomical rooms were vacant for one year until they were taken over by Joseph Pancoast.

== School of Anatomy ==
In 1838, Pancoast left the school to join the Jefferson Medical School. James McClintock renovated the dissection room in the South East corner of the building on Eighth and Walnut Street and named it the Philadelphia School of Anatomy. He had to move from his previous location due to complaints from the neighbors about the odors coming from the dissection rooms. The school had a second building near Zane (now Filbert) Street and Seventh Street. The two story building had a lecture hall with tiered seating on the first floor, and a well-lit and ventilated dissection room on the second floor. The school was ideally located close to the University of Pennsylvania and Jefferson Medical College.

McClintock left in 1841 to join the Castleton Medical College and gave control of the school to Jonathan M. Allen but returned in 1842. McClintock expanded the school in 1844 but left again in 1847 to establish the Philadelphia College of Medicine, and control of the school passed to Allen again until 1852.

David Hayes Agnew ran the school from 1852 to 1862. The school only had nine students when Agnew purchased it, but he increased the student population to 267. Agnew became seriously ill during the winter of 1854–1855 from a wound received during an autopsy, and William Goodell took over responsibility for the school and supervising dissections. The school employed many notable instructors including James Garretson, Henry Leffmann for physiological and clinical chemistry, and Charles E. de M. Sajous for diseases of the throat and nasal passages. Silas Weir Mitchell conducted experiments on rattlesnake venom at the school.

The school struggled during the American Civil War as students from the South left to attend schools in Baltimore and Richmond. From 1866 to 1875, it was run by William Williams Keen. The school closed in 1875 and the buildings were razed for the construction of a United States Post Office.

The school no longer existed as a distinct entity, however L.W. Steinbach continued teaching under the school's certificate and name through the Philadelphia Polyclinic and the Philadelphia Dental College. The Philadelphia Dental College became the dental department of Temple University and the Philadelphia School of Anatomy name continued to be used on their anatomical rooms until 1906.
