= American Anthropometric Society =

Brain collection organization in Philadelphia, Pennsylvania

The American Anthropometric Society, also known as the Brain Society, was a Philadelphia-based anthropometry organization of physicians, scientists and intellectuals founded in 1889. Members agreed to donate their brains after their deaths for analysis by living members of the organization in order to correlate intelligence and other mental qualities with brain morphology. The society claimed to have approximately 300 members. The last brain collected was in 1938. Notable donors to the collection included some of the top medical and scientific leaders of Philadelphia at the time and the poet Walt Whitman. Analyses of the brains in the collection showed there was no correlation between intelligence and brain size but nothing else of scientific interest. The remaining twenty-two brains from the collection are currently stored at the Wistar Institute.

== History ==
The society was founded in 1889 in Philadelphia by Harrison Allen, Francis Xavier Dercum, Joseph Leidy, Silas Weir Mitchell, William Pepper, Edward Charles Spitzka and Isaac J. Wistar. It was modeled after the Society of Mutual Autopsy founded in Paris in 1881. While phrenology, the pseudoscience that linked bumps on the skull to mental traits, was popular in the early 19th century, the American Anthropometric Society believed that differences in brain morphology could predict intelligence, personality and other personal characteristics. A spin-off society was created by Burt Green Wilder, who quit the American Anthropometric Society in 1891 and formed the much larger Wilder Brain Collection, at Cornell University.

In the beginning, most autopsies were conducted by Allen and Dercum. however, the pathologist Henry Ware Cattel was hired in 1892 to remove the brains and properly preserve them. The organization claimed to have over 300 members, but only a few publicly announced their membership. At one point, the society possessed approximately 50 brains of non-eminent persons, most likely prisoners and asylum patients. When the collection was transferred to the Wistar Institute, these brains were most likely discarded. The last brain donated to the collection was Henry Herbert Donaldson's in 1938.

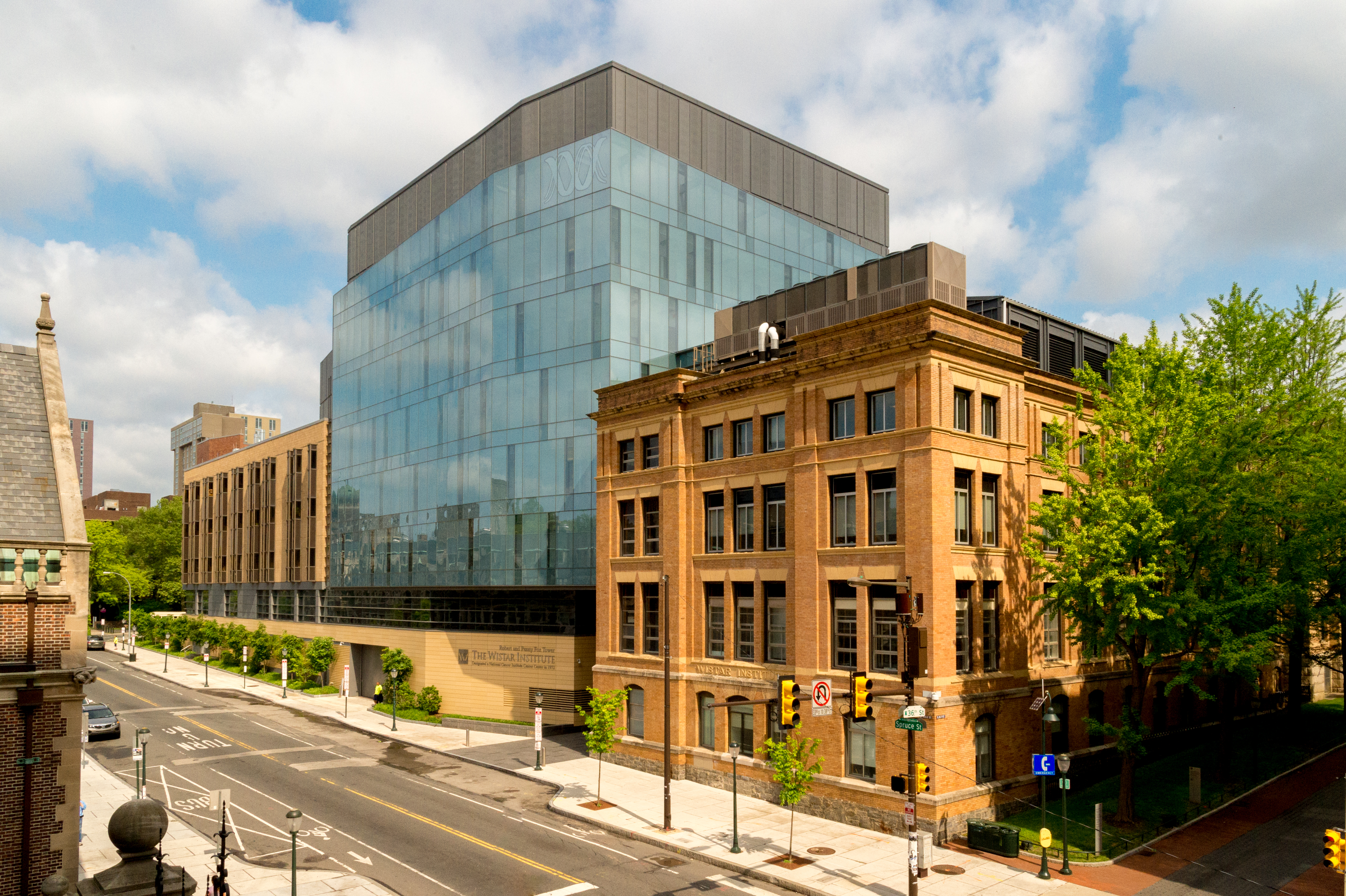
The remaining twenty-two brains from the collection are stored at the Wistar Institute

Twenty-two brains from the collection are currently stored at the Wistar Institute in Philadelphia. Records at the Wistar Institute show that there were only two dozen brains ever stored there.

== Analysis of brains ==
In 1907, Edward Anthony Spitzka published a paper on his study of six brains bequeathed to the society. Spitzka claimed that brain weight was correlated with intelligence and that brain fissures, frontal lobe development, and the corpus callosum were more developed in the brains of eminent men. His work was roundly criticized by other scientists since he had not taken shrinkage of the brains into consideration.

Spitzka's publication caused a minor sensation due to his mention of the status of Walt Whitman's brain. He wrote, "The brain of Walt Whitman, together with the jar in which it was placed, was said to have been dropped on the floor by a careless assistant. Unfortunately, not even the pieces were saved." However, in his personal diary sometime between 1891 and 1893, Henry Ware Cattell confessed to accidentally allowing Whitman's brain to decompose during the preservation process by "not having the jar properly covered". He may have left the jar uncovered or forgot to add additional preservative for as long as six months.

In 1919, the brain of William Osler was examined by Myrtelle Canavan and Henry Herbert Donaldson. They observed no unusual characteristics in the surface of his brain but did not section it or evaluate it histologically. In 1959, Wilder Penfield of the Montreal Neurological Institute arranged to have Osler's brain brought to his institute and evaluated. The brain was evaluated both grossly and histologically, and no significant differences were observed between his brain and those of less eminent persons. Osler's brain was returned to Philadelphia; however, some of the histological samples were obtained by a rare book collector and sold on eBay.

In a time when some anthropologists claimed that brain and skull measurement were impacted by race and sex, Franklin P. Mall conducted studies using the brains of the American Anthropometric Society to prove this claim untrue. Analysis of the brains in the American Anthropometric Society and other brain clubs proved that brain weight was not an accurate predictor of intelligence but not much else.

== Notable donors ==
- Harrison Allen (1841–1897), physician and anatomist
- Edward Drinker Cope (1840–1897), zoologist, paleontologist, comparative anatomist, herpetologist and ichthyologist
- Henry Herbert Donaldson (1857–1938), neuroscientist
- Joseph Leidy (1823–1891), paleontologist, parasitologist and anatomist
- William Osler (1849–1919), physician, one of the founders of Johns Hopkins Hospital
- William Pepper (1843–1898), physician, medical educator and eleventh Provost of the University of Pennsylvania
- J. William White (1850–1916), surgeon
- Walt Whitman (1819–1892), poet, essayist and journalist
