= Thomas Nasca =

American nephrologist

- Born: Thomas J. Nasca; 1949 (age 76–77); White Plains, New York
- Education: University of Notre Dame (B.S.); Jefferson Medical College (M.D.)
- Occupations: Academic; Nephrologist
- Employer: Accreditation Council for Graduate Medical Education
- Title: President and Chief Executive Officer, ACGME (2007–2024)
- Awards: Master of the American College of Physicians; Honorary doctorates (including University of Toledo)

Thomas Joseph Nasca (born 1949) is an American nephrologist, medical educator, and administrator who served as president and chief executive officer of the Accreditation Council for Graduate Medical Education (ACGME) from 2007 to 2024.

Thomas J. Nasca Professionalism Award is named is his honor.

== Early life and education ==
Nasca grew up in White Plains, New York. He earned a Bachelor of Science degree with high honors from the University of Notre Dame in 1971 and a medical degree from Jefferson Medical College in 1975. He completed his residency from UPMC Mercy, trained in internal medicine at Mercy Hospital of Pittsburgh, and completed a nephrology fellowship at Rhode Island Hospital.

== Career ==
Nasca joined Jefferson's faculty in 1992 as vice chair of medicine and directed its residency program and the division of nephrology. He became acting dean in July 2000 and was appointed dean and senior vice‑president for academic affairs in January 2001, also overseeing Jefferson University Physicians. During his tenure, he emphasized outcomes-based curricula and expanded student financial aid.

In September 2007, Nasca left Jefferson to lead the Chicago‑based the Accreditation Council for Graduate Medical Education (ACGME). He led implementation of the Next Accreditation System, unified accreditation pathways for MD and DO programs, and launched initiatives focused on physician well-being, diversity, and global standards. He announced he would step down effective January 2025 to found the ACGME Center for Professionalism and the Future of Medicine.

In 2024, Nasca served as honorary chair of the Arnold P. Gold Foundation's annual gala supporting humanistic medical education programs.

== Selected publications ==
- Spandorfer, John; Pohl, Charles A.; Rattner, Susan L.; Nasca, Thomas J. (1 September 2009) Professionalism in Medicine: A Case-Based Guide for Medical Students, Cambridge University Press.
- Nasca, Thomas J.; Day, Susan H.; Amis, E. Stephen (July 8, 2010). "The New Recommendations on Duty Hours from the ACGME Task Force". New England Journal of Medicine. 363 (2): e3. doi:10.1056/NEJMsb1005800. PMID 20573917 – via Taylor and Francis+NEJM.

== Awards and recognition ==
Nasca was elected a Master of the American College of Physicians in 2006. He has appeared multiple times on Modern Healthcare's list of 50 Most Influential Physician Executives, and has received several honorary doctorates, including one from the University of Toledo in 2013 for his service to medical education.
