= Greater ghost bat =

Conservation status
- Data Deficient (IUCN 3.1)

Scientific classification
- Kingdom: Animalia
- Phylum: Chordata
- Class: Mammalia
- Order: Chiroptera
- Family: Emballonuridae
- Genus: Diclidurus
- Species: D. ingens

Binomial name
- Diclidurus ingens Hernandez-Camacho, 1955
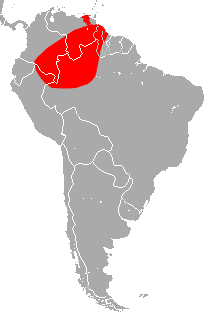
- Greater ghost bat range

Species of bat

The greater ghost bat (Diclidurus ingens) is a bat species found in northwestern Brazil, southeastern Colombia, Guyana, Peru, and Venezuela.
