= Edward Charles Spitzka =

American physician and anatomist (1852–1914)

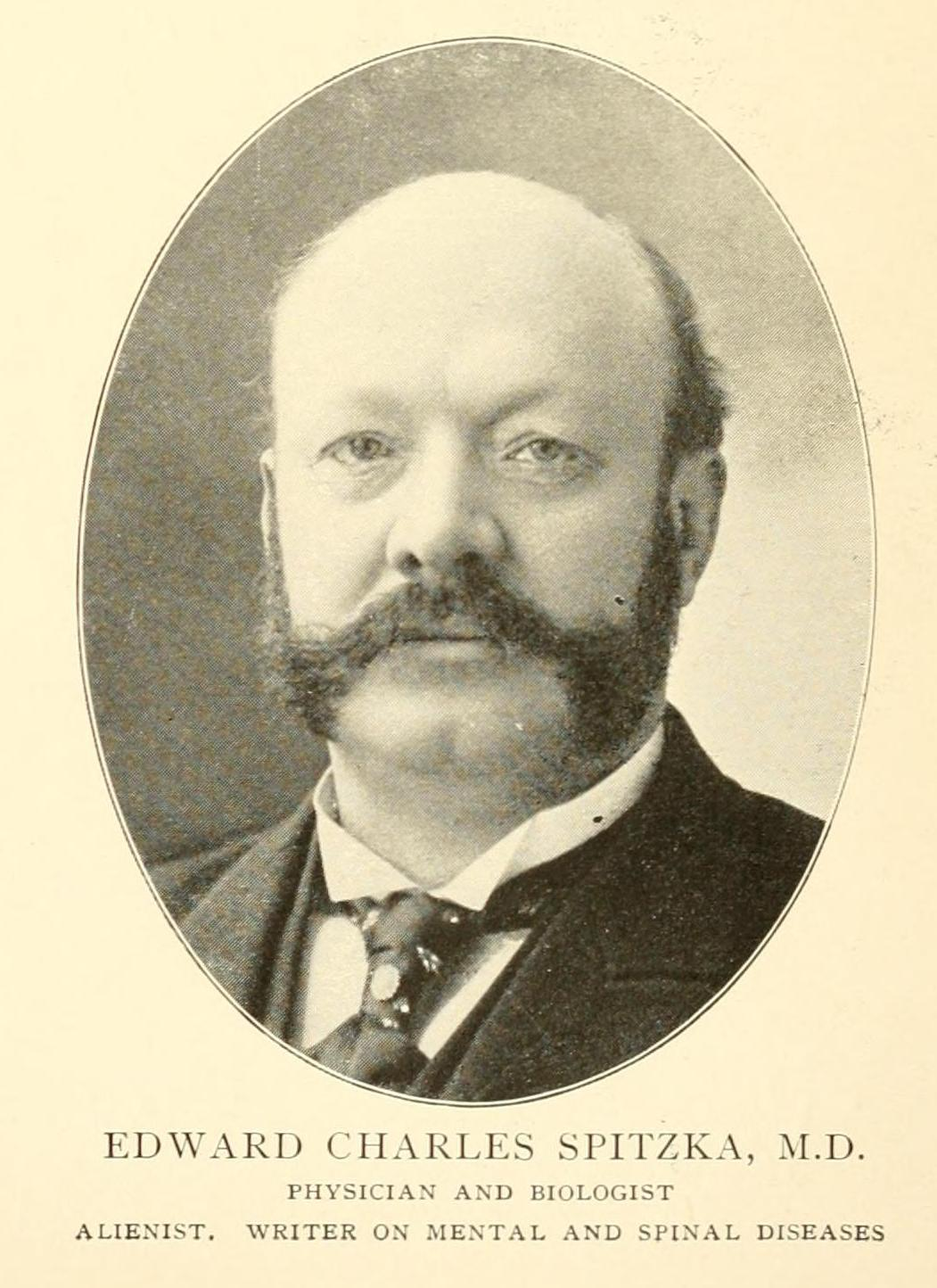
- Dr. Edward Spitzka
- Born: November 10, 1852; New York City, New York, United States
- Died: January 13, 1914 (aged 61); New York City, New York, United States
- Occupations: Alienist, neurologist, anatomist
- Spouse: Catherine Watzek
- Children: Edward Anthony Spitzka
- Parent(s): Charles Anthony Spitzka and Johanna (Tag) Spitzka

Edward Charles Spitzka (November 10, 1852 – January 13, 1914) was an American alienist, neurologist, and anatomist whose work encompassed psychiatry, neuroanatomy, and forensic medicine. He was the author of the 1883 textbook Insanity: Its Classification, Diagnosis and Treatment which described and classified a range of psychiatric disorders. Spitzka also served as an expert witness in the 1881 trial of Charles J. Guiteau for the assassination of President James A. Garfield, where he testified in support of Guiteau's insanity defense. He later attended the 1890 execution of William Kemmler, the first person executed by electric chair.

== Early life and education ==
Spitzka was born in New York City to Charles Anthony and Johanna (Tag) Spitzka. Spitzka's father, a watch and clockmaker, fled Germany following the Revolution of 1848, which he had supported.

Spitzka studied for two years at the College of the City of New York, now known as the City College of New York. He next enrolled in the Medical Department of the University of the City of New York, now New York University, and graduated in 1873.

Spitzka, who was fluent in German, spent the next three years in Europe, where he studied at the medical schools of the University of Leipzig and the University of Vienna. In Vienna, he studied with anatomist and psychiatrist Theodor Meynert and embryologist Samuel Leopold Schenk, both of whom influenced the direction of his later career.

== Career ==
In 1876, Spitzka returned to New York City. He practiced surgery at Mount Sinai Hospital and was a consulting neurologist to the North-Eastern Dispensary and St. Mark's Hospital. In 1880, Spitzka was the first to describe the interoptic lobes of the reptilian brain.

Spitzka worked as a professor of nervous and mental diseases and of medical jurisprudence at the New York Post-Graduate Medical College from 1882 to 1887. In 1877, Spitzka's essay "Somatic Etiology of Insanity" won the W. and S. Tuke prize in an international competition run by the Medico-Psychological Association. In 1878, his paper "The Anatomical and Physiological Effects of Strychina on the Brain, Spinal Cord and Nerves" won the William A. Hammond prize, awarded by the American Neurological Association.

In 1883, Spitzka wrote Insanity: Its Classification, Diagnosis and Treatment – A Manual for Students and Practitioners of Medicine. In the textbook, Spitzka recommended treatment based on clinical observations. He detailed seven psychiatric syndromes: mania, melancholia, katatonia, secondary deteriorations, hebephrenia, circular insanity, and monomania. Contemporary reviews appeared in the Boston Medical and Surgical Journal and the Journal of Mental Science. The former described the book as “valuable” and “of real use to the alienist.” Spitzka's classifications may also have influenced the nosology of Emil Kraepelin, a German psychiatrist associated with the development of modern scientific psychiatry.

=== Trial of Charles J. Guiteau ===
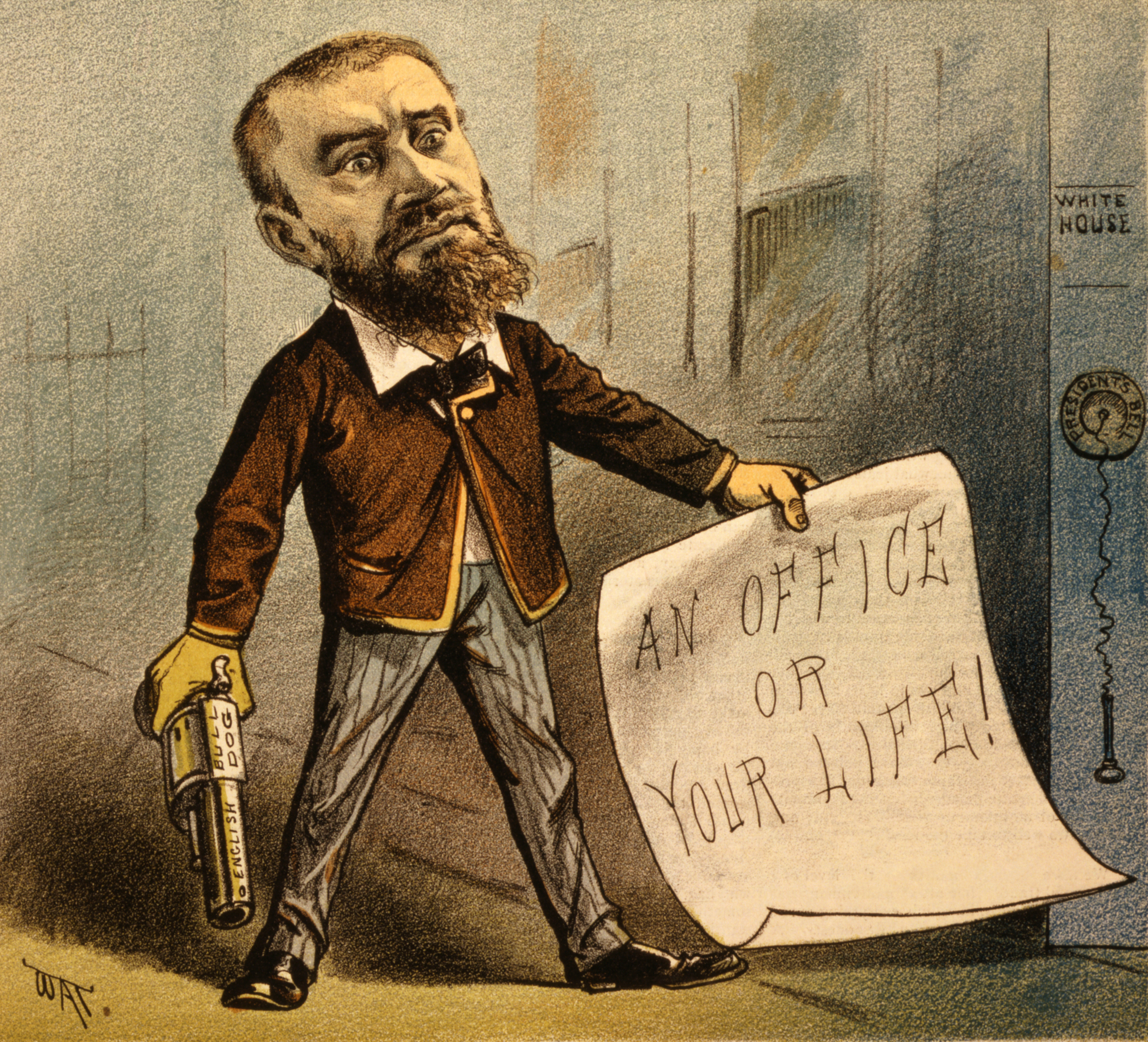
Political cartoon from the cover of Puck Magazine on 13 July 1881, showing assassin Charles Guiteau

In 1881, Spitzka was an expert witness at the trial of Charles J. Guiteau, who was accused of the assassination of United States President James A. Garfield. The trial was one of the first high-profile cases in the United States in which the insanity defense was considered.

While on the stand, Spitzka testified that he had "no doubt" that Guiteau was both insane and "a moral monstrosity." Spitzka concluded that Guiteau had "the insane manner" he had often observed in asylums, adding that Guiteau was a "morbid egotist" who "misinterpreted and overly personalized the real events of life."

Guiteau was found guilty of assassinating Garfield despite his lawyers raising an insanity defense. He was sentenced to death and executed by hanging on June 30, 1882, in Washington, D.C.

=== Execution of William Kemmler ===
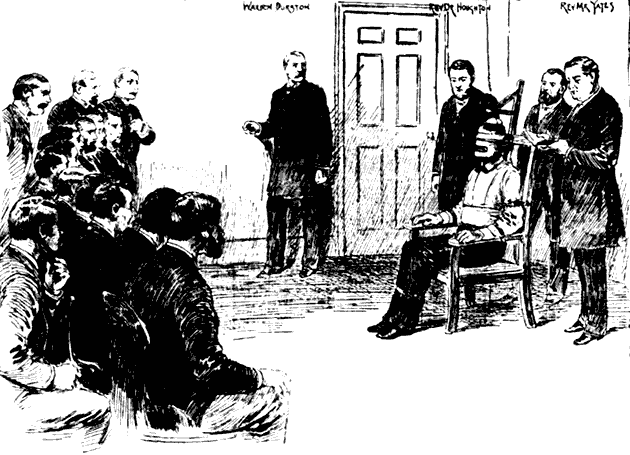
The execution of William Kemmler from the New York Herald on 7 August 1890

Spitzka was one of two attending physicians at the execution of William Kemmler in New York's Auburn Prison on August 6, 1890, the first execution using the new electric chair. During the execution he confirmed Kemmler to be dead, only for it to be discovered that Kemmler was still alive.

=== Professional organizations ===
Spitzka was involved in professional organizations throughout his career. He was editor of the American Journal of Neurology and Psychiatry from 1881 to 1884; president of the New York Neurological Society from 1883 to 1884; vice president of the Section of Neurology of the Ninth International Medical Congress in Washington in 1887; president of the American Neurological Society in 1890; and chairman of the Section of Somatology at the Congress of Arts and Sciences in St. Louis in 1904. He was also a founding member of the American Anthropometric Society, whose purpose was to collect the brains of eminent scientists to further brain science.

== Personal life ==
On June 30, 1875, Spitzka married Catherine Watzek in Vienna. Their son, Edward Anthony Spitzka, was born on June 17, 1876. Edward Anthony Spitzka became an anatomist and later autopsied the brain of Leon Czolgosz, the assassin of United States President William McKinley.

== Death ==
Spitzka died of apoplexy at his home in New York City on January 13, 1914, at age 61. He had previously been suffering from necrosis of the upper jaw.

== Selected publications ==
- Spitzka, Edward Charles (April 1880). "The Architecture and Mechanism of the Brain". Journal of Nervous & Mental Disease. 7 (2): 208–249.
- Spitzka, Edward Charles (1883). Insanity: Its Classification, Diagnosis and Treatment – A Manual for Students and Practitioners of Medicine. New York: Bermingham & Co.
- Spitzka, Edward Charles (1899). "The Legal Disabilities of Natural Children Justified Biologically and Historically". The Alienist and Neurologist. 20: 390–407.
- Spitzka, Edward Charles (1902). "Political Assassins: Are They All Insane?". The Journal of Mental Pathology. 2 (2): 69–82.
