= Isabelle's ghost bat =

Conservation status
- Least Concern (IUCN 3.1)

Scientific classification
- Kingdom: Animalia
- Phylum: Chordata
- Class: Mammalia
- Infraclass: Placentalia
- Order: Chiroptera
- Family: Emballonuridae
- Genus: Diclidurus
- Species: D. isabella

Binomial name
- Diclidurus isabella Thomas, 1920
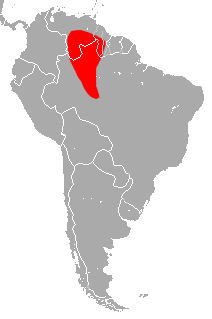
- Isabelle's ghost bat range

Species of bat

Isabelle's ghost bat (Diclidurus isabella) is a bat species found in northwestern Brazil, Guyana, and Venezuela, and possibly Colombia.

It was discovered in October 1916 by Emilie Snethlage, and described by Oldfield Thomas in 1920. While the species name is suggestive that he named it after someone, his notes did not say this as they usually would. It has been suggested that the species name is instead a reference to the color isabelline. In that case, the common name should instead be the isabelline ghost bat. They are pale brown in color, with the head and shoulders appearing whitish. Their forearms are approximately 54 mm (2.1 in) long.
