= John Chalmers DaCosta =

American surgeon

Personal details
- Born: 15 November 1863 Washington D.C.
- Died: 16 May 1933 (aged 69) Philadelphia

John Chalmers DaCosta (1863–1933) was an American surgeon and physician.

== Life ==
He was born in Washington DC on November 15, 1863.

After the American Civil War, his family moved to Philadelphia and John Chalmers' interest in surgery began. He studied chemistry at the University of Pennsylvania for two years, and then attended Jefferson Medical College, graduating as class valedictorian in 1885.

== Bibliography ==
His notable books include:

- Anatomy, descriptive and surgical
- Atlas and epitome of operative surgery
- A manual of modern surgery, general and operative
- Modern surgery, general and operative
- A new pronouncing dictionary of medicine. Being a voluminous and exhaustive hand-book of medical and scientific terminology, with phonetic pronunciation, accentuation, etymology, etc.
