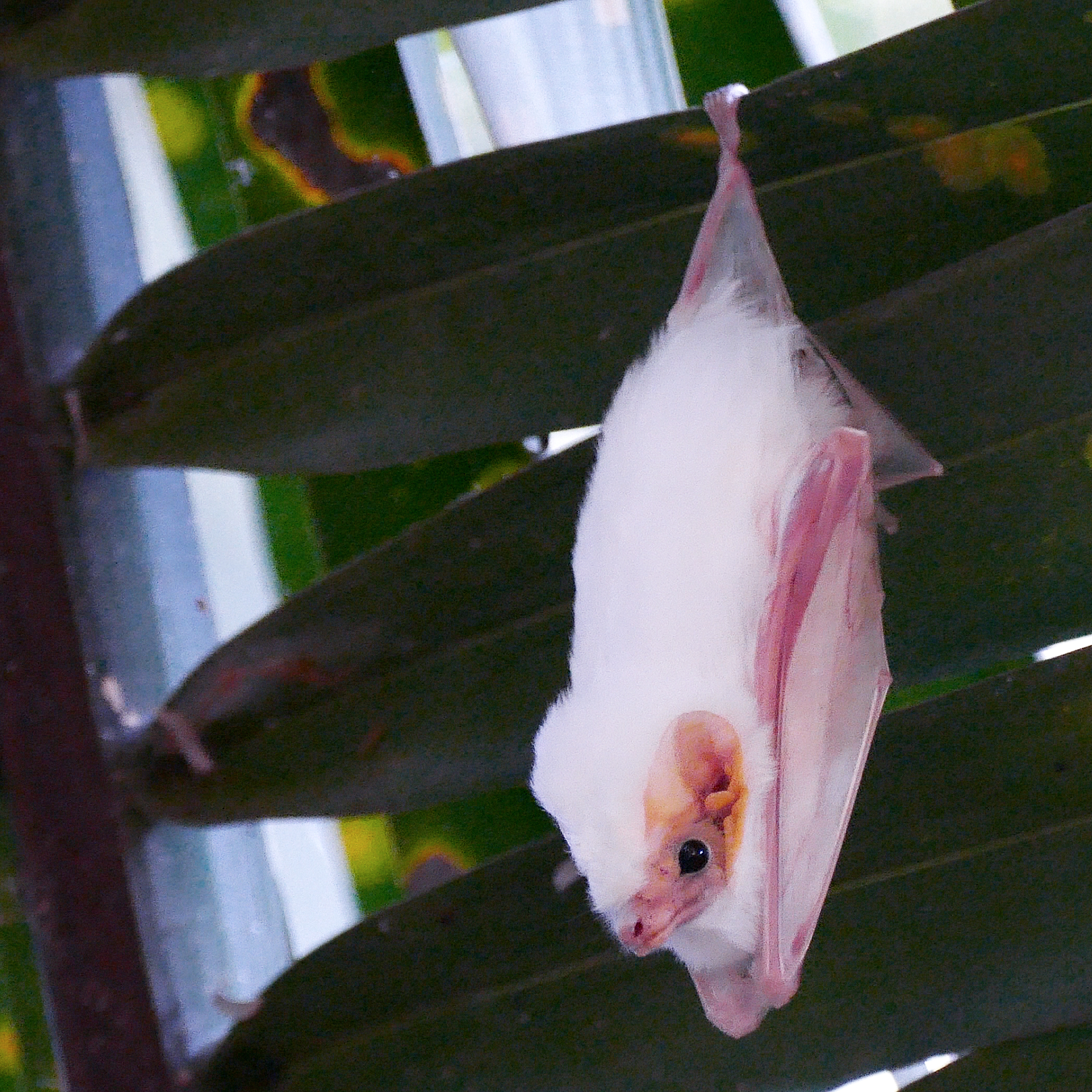

Conservation status
- Least Concern (IUCN 3.1)

Scientific classification
- Kingdom: Animalia
- Phylum: Chordata
- Class: Mammalia
- Order: Chiroptera
- Family: Emballonuridae
- Genus: Diclidurus
- Species: D. albus

Binomial name
- Diclidurus albus Wied-Neuwied, 1820
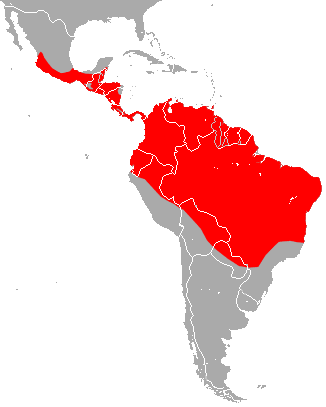
- Northern ghost bat range

= Northern ghost bat =

Species of bat

The northern ghost bat (Diclidurus albus) is a bat species from South America, Trinidad, and Central America. It is a relatively rare, completely white, insectivorous bat, with an unusual sac at the base of its tail.

== Description ==
The northern ghost bat is a member of the family Emballonuridae in the order Chiroptera. It is considered medium-sized for its genus, Diclidurus. It is pure white to pale grey in color, with some dark-grey basal pelage. In stark contrast to other members of the family Emballonuridae, it does not have wing-sacs, but rather, a large glandular structure located centrally with respect to its uropatagium. The species derives its name from its habitual locale and glandular form. Diclidurus is from the Latin word diclid, or two-valved, which describes the multi-chambered nature of its uropatagium gland.

The northern ghost bat can be distinguished from other members of its genus by the presence of a vestigial thumb with a near-absent claw. Amongst the northern ghost bat population, sexual dimorphism is present. Specifically, males tend to be slightly larger in size when compared to females. Diclidurus albus is intermediate in weight relative to other members of the family Emballonuridae.

The northern ghost bat has a widely shaped clavicle bone, with large areas of attachment for the pectoralis muscle. It also has a large glandular structure on its uropatagium. The functional significance of this glandular structure is thought to be analogous to that of wing sacs in other emballonurids. When breeding, the wing sacs of other emballonurids become enlarged to attract females.

The penis of the northern ghost bat does not employ a baculum, but rather, is composed of four cartilaginous bodies. It is about 5.5 mm long and 3.1 mm in diameter. The glans penis is white in color, and the prepuce is encased in a layer of short, fine hair. The testes are spindle-like in shape, symmetrical, and enclosed in a black tunica. In females, the ovaries are ovoid in shape and are roughly 2.8 mm long and 0.8 mm in diameter.

== Habitat ==
Northern ghost bats inhabit tropical and coastal forests, and frequently roost in caves, in the open, or in palm trees. When roosting in palm trees, individual bats tend to occupy the space closest to the rachis (stem) of the palm frond. Hanging bats are inconspicuous, and mirror the appearance of a wasp's nest. Roosts can be found in caves, deep rock crevices, and old mines. Although ghost bats prefer to roost in colonies, they currently only roost in small groups at best due to a lack of roosting sites that support larger colonies; colonies of more than 100 bats in one location are rarely seen. It often roosts singly under palm leaves.

The distribution of the northern ghost bat is confined to the neotropics. Its range extends as far north as the tropical mainland of Mexico and as far south as the tropics of Brazil. Its distribution is limited relative to other members of its genus. Altitudinally, it lives within the sea-level to 1500 m range.

== Feeding behavior and diet ==
Northern ghost bats are primarily insectivorous, with a diet that mainly consists of large, airborne insects like moths and beetles. They forage in open spaces above the forest canopy, often using echolocation to locate their prey at night. Their echolocation calls are at a high frequency, allowing them to detect small insects in open spaces where fewer obstacles are presentcation and Flight Patterns. The northern ghost bat's echolocation calls are distinct due to their high frequency and narrow bandwidth, which allows the bat to detect and capture flying insects at considerable distances. These bats exhibit agile flight, maneuvering easily through open areas. This adaptation supports their preference for foraging in open environments, unlike many bats that forage within denser forested areas .

== Reproductive behavior ==
The glandular structure on the uropatagium of Diclidurus albus may play a role in reproductive behaviors, similar to scent glands found in other bats of the family Emballonuridae. It is believed that the gland releases pheromones during the mating season to attract females. Although direct studies on the northern ghost bat's mating behaviors are limited, observations of related species suggest that these glands are primarily used in courtship displays.

== Conservation status and fragmentation ==
The northern ghost bat is generally not considered endangered but is sensitive to habitat disturbance. Deforestation and habitat fragmentation in tropical forests can limit the availability of suitable roosting sites, potentially disrupting colony sizes and social structures. Although these bats can adapt to some modified landscapes, severe habitat loss could impact their long-term survival. The conservation of large, uninterrupted tracts of tropical forest is crucial for their continued stability.

== Thermoregulation and behavior ==
Observations indicate that northern ghost bats may use specific roosting behaviors to regulate their body temperature. By positioning themselves near the rachis of palm fronds or within the depth of rock crevices, these bats avoid excessive temperature fluctuations and maintain an optimal environment for resting. This behavior highlights their adaptive strategies for thriving in diverse and potentially challenging tropical climates.

== Biology ==
Diclidurus albus is an insectivore that feeds primarily on moths. It flies high above the ground in open spaces when feeding, usually in a straight fashion. In Costa Rica, it is known to sing when feeding. The sounds that it makes during its songs are thought to be unique to the genus.
