= List of mammals of Venezuela =

This is a list of the mammal species recorded in Venezuela. Of the mammal species in Venezuela, one is critically endangered, six are endangered, nineteen are vulnerable, and four are near threatened. One species is classified as extinct.

The following tags are used to highlight each species' conservation status as assessed by the International Union for Conservation of Nature:

EX	Extinct	No reasonable doubt that the last individual has died.
EW	Extinct in the wild	Known only to survive in captivity or as a naturalized populations well outside its previous range.
CR	Critically endangered	The species is in imminent risk of extinction in the wild.
EN	Endangered	The species is facing an extremely high risk of extinction in the wild.
VU	Vulnerable	The species is facing a high risk of extinction in the wild.
NT	Near threatened	The species does not meet any of the criteria that would categorise it as risking extinction but it is likely to do so in the future.
LC	Least concern	There are no current identifiable risks to the species.
DD	Data deficient	There is inadequate information to make an assessment of the risks to this species.

Some species were assessed using an earlier set of criteria. Species assessed using this system have the following instead of near threatened and least concern categories:

LR/cd	Lower risk/conservation dependent	Species which were the focus of conservation programmes and may have moved into a higher risk category if that programme was discontinued.
LR/nt	Lower risk/near threatened	Species which are close to being classified as vulnerable but are not the subject of conservation programmes.
LR/lc	Lower risk/least concern	Species for which there are no identifiable risks.

== Subclass: Theria ==
=== Infraclass: Metatheria ===
==== Order: Didelphimorphia (common opossums) ====
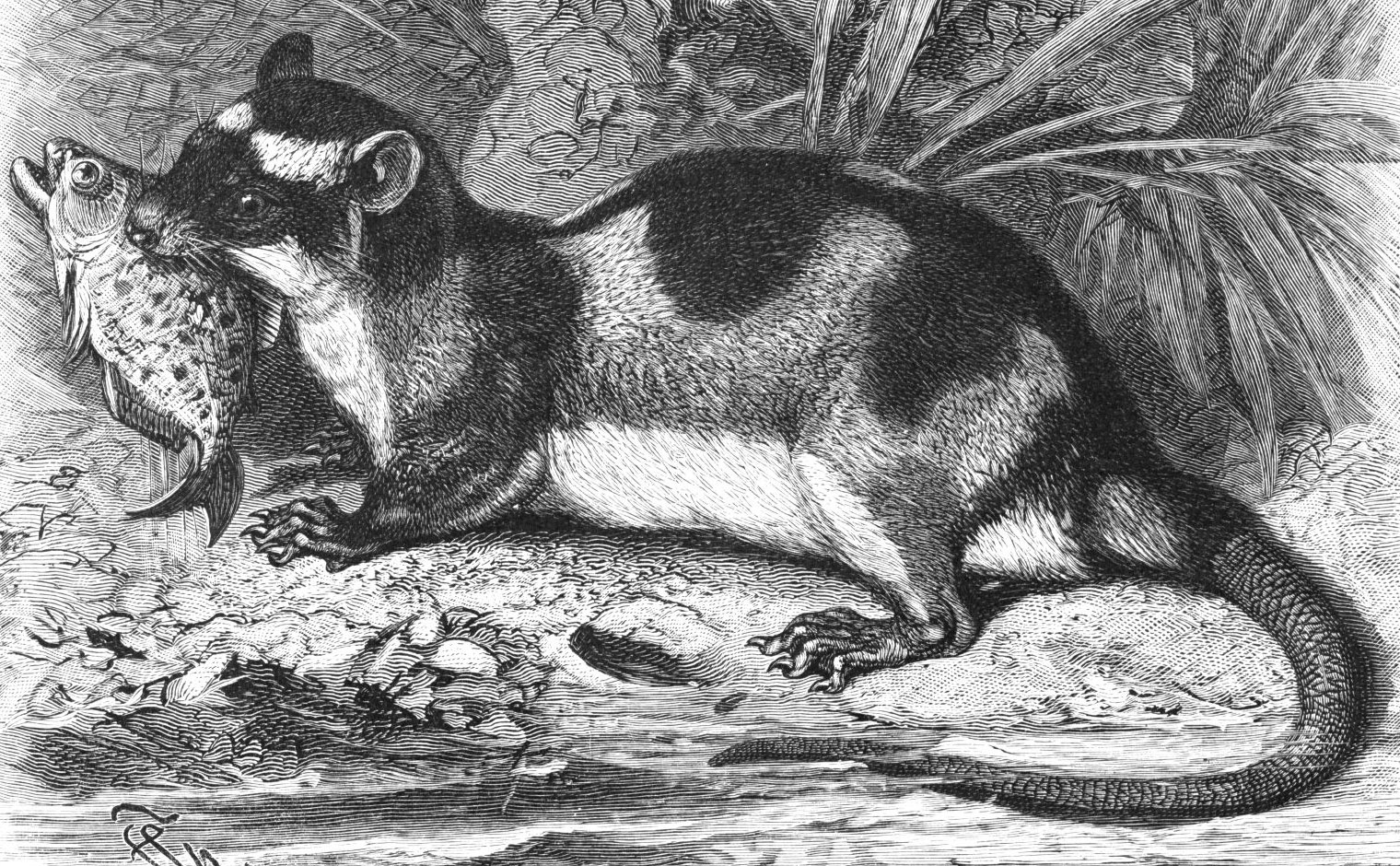
Water opossum

Didelphimorphia is the order of common opossums of the Western Hemisphere. Opossums probably diverged from the basic South American marsupials in the late Cretaceous or early Paleocene. They are small to medium-sized marsupials, about the size of a large house cat, with a long snout and prehensile tail.

- Family: Didelphidae (American opossums)
  - Subfamily: Caluromyinae
    - Genus: Caluromys
      - Brown-eared woolly opossum, Caluromys lanatus LR/nt
      - Bare-tailed woolly opossum, Caluromys philander LR/nt
  - Subfamily: Didelphinae
    - Genus: Chironectes
      - Water opossum, Chironectes minimus LR/nt
    - Genus: Didelphis
      - White-eared opossum, Didelphis albiventris LR/lc
      - Common opossum, Didelphis marsupialis LR/lc
    - Genus: Gracilinanus
      - Wood sprite gracile opossum, Gracilinanus dryas VU
      - Northern gracile opossum, Gracilinanus marica LR/nt
    - Genus: Lutreolina
      - Big lutrine opossum, Lutreolina crassicaudata LR/lc
    - Genus: Marmosa
      - Woolly mouse opossum, Marmosa demerarae LR/lc
      - Linnaeus's mouse opossum, Marmosa murina LR/lc
      - Robinson's mouse opossum, Marmosa robinsoni LR/lc
      - Tyler's mouse opossum, Marmosa tyleriana DD
      - Guajira mouse opossum, Marmosa xerophila EN
    - Genus: Marmosops
      - Narrow-headed slender opossum, Marmosops cracens EN
      - Dusky slender opossum, Marmosops fuscatus LR/nt
      - Tschudi's slender opossum, Marmosops impavidus LR/nt
      - Delicate slender opossum, Marmosops parvidens LR/nt
    - Genus: Metachirus
      - Brown four-eyed opossum, Metachirus nudicaudatus LR/lc
    - Genus: Monodelphis
      - Northern red-sided opossum, Monodelphis brevicaudata LR/lc
    - Genus: Philander
      - Anderson's four-eyed opossum, Philander andersoni LR/lc
      - Gray four-eyed opossum, Philander opossum LR/lc

==== Order: Paucituberculata (shrew opossums) ====
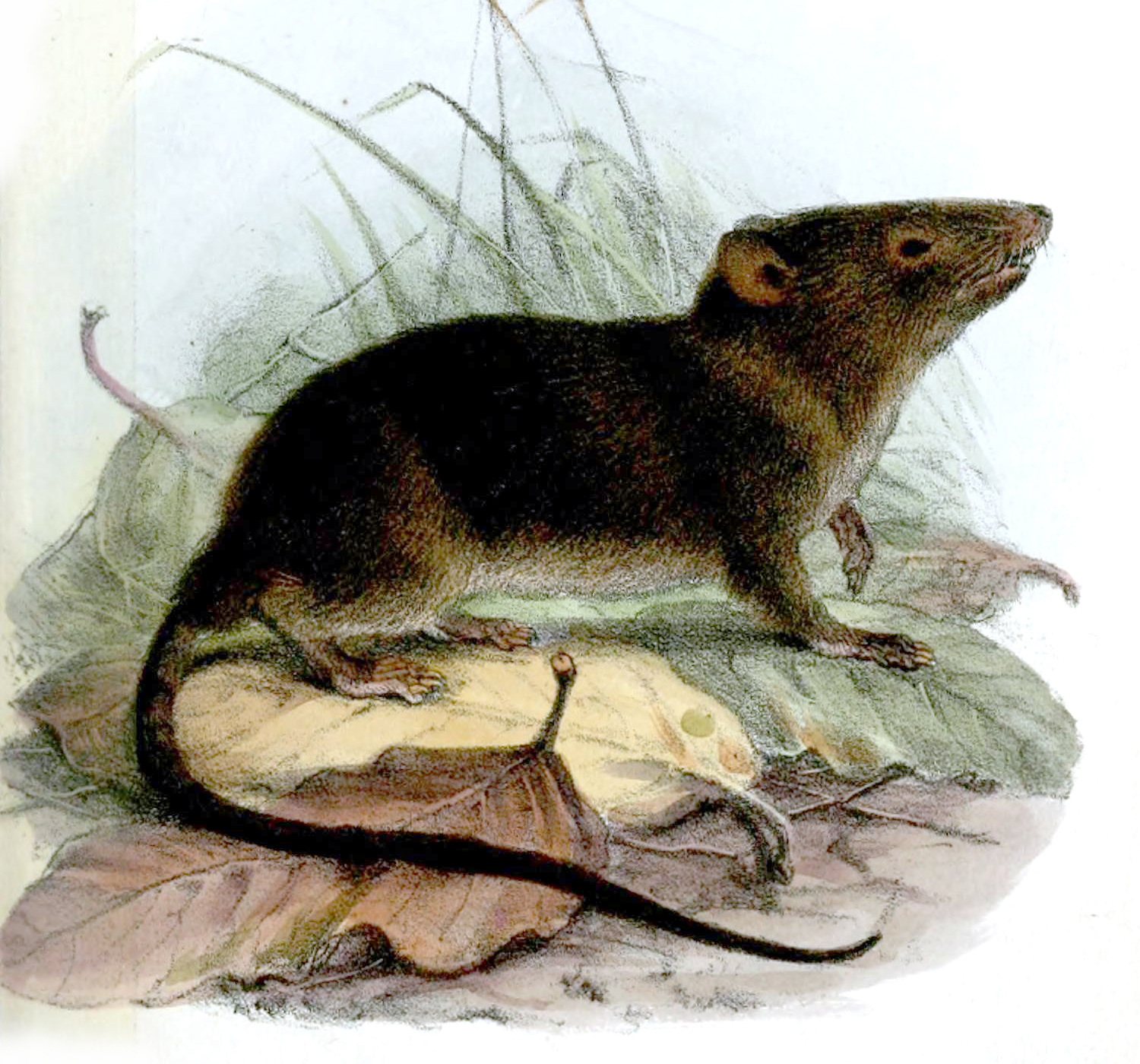
Dusky caenolestid

There are six extant species of shrew opossum. They are small shrew-like marsupials confined to the Andes.

- Family: Caenolestidae
  - Genus: Caenolestes
    - Dusky caenolestid, C. fuliginosus LC

=== Infraclass: Eutheria ===
==== Order: Sirenia (manatees and dugongs) ====
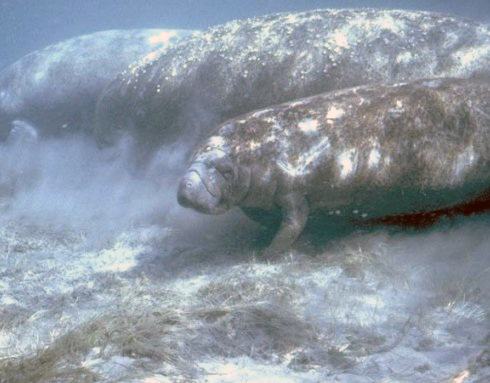
West Indian manatees

Sirenia is an order of fully aquatic, herbivorous mammals that inhabit rivers, estuaries, coastal marine waters, swamps, and marine wetlands. All four species are endangered.

- Family: Trichechidae
  - Genus: Trichechus
    - West Indian manatee, Trichechus manatus VU

==== Order: Cingulata (armadillos) ====
The armadillos are small mammals with a bony armored shell. They are native to the Americas. There are around 20 extant species.

- Family: Dasypodidae (armadillos)
  - Subfamily: Dasypodinae
    - Genus: Dasypus
      - Greater long-nosed armadillo, Dasypus kappleri LC
      - Nine-banded armadillo, Dasypus novemcinctus LC
      - Llanos long-nosed armadillo, Dasypus sabanicola LC
  - Subfamily: Tolypeutinae
    - Genus: Cabassous
      - Northern naked-tailed armadillo, Cabassous centralis DD
      - Southern naked-tailed armadillo, Cabassous unicinctus LC
    - Genus: Priodontes
      - Giant armadillo, Priodontes maximus VU

==== Order: Pilosa (anteaters, sloths and tamanduas) ====
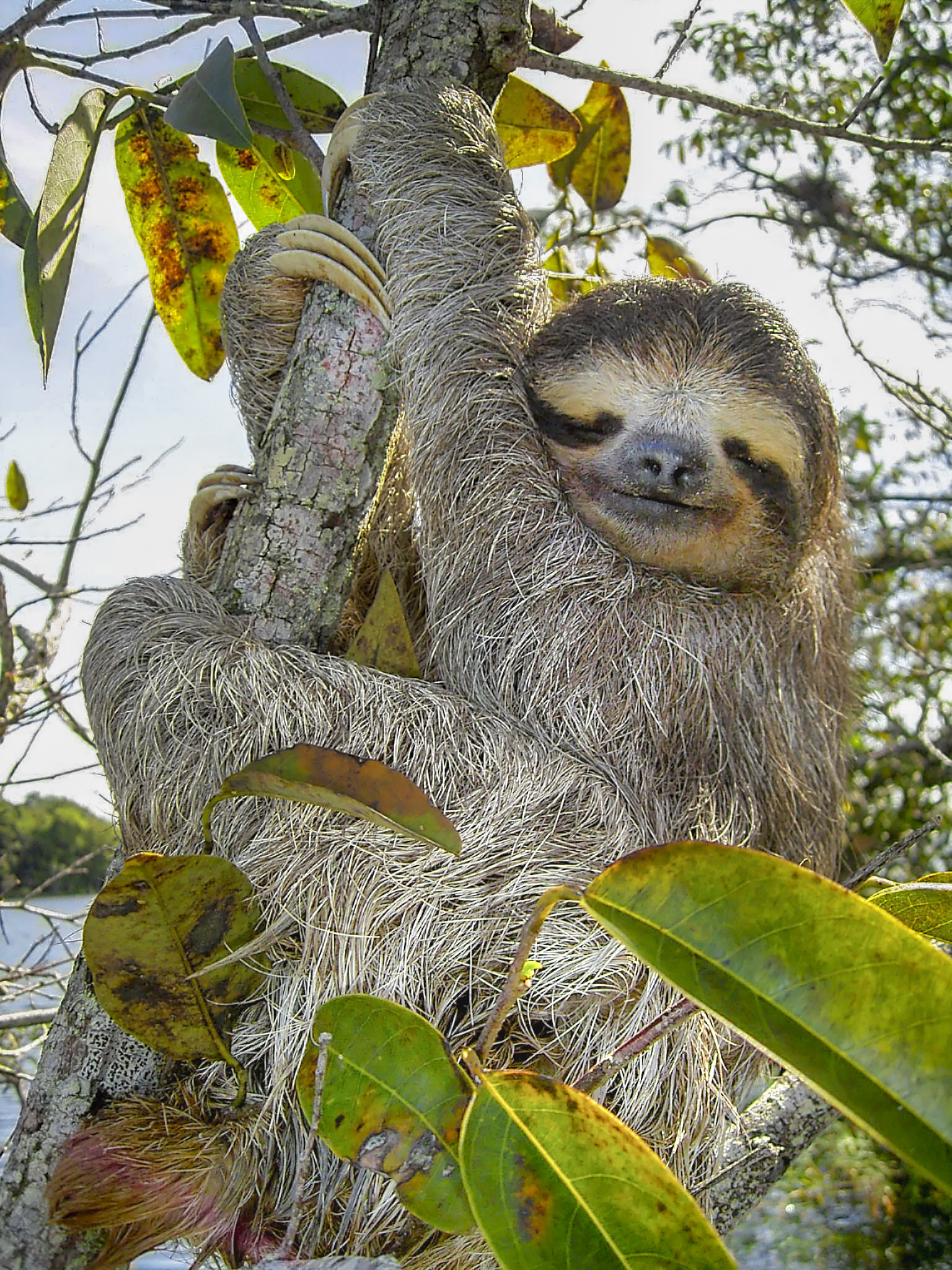
Brown-throated three-toed sloth

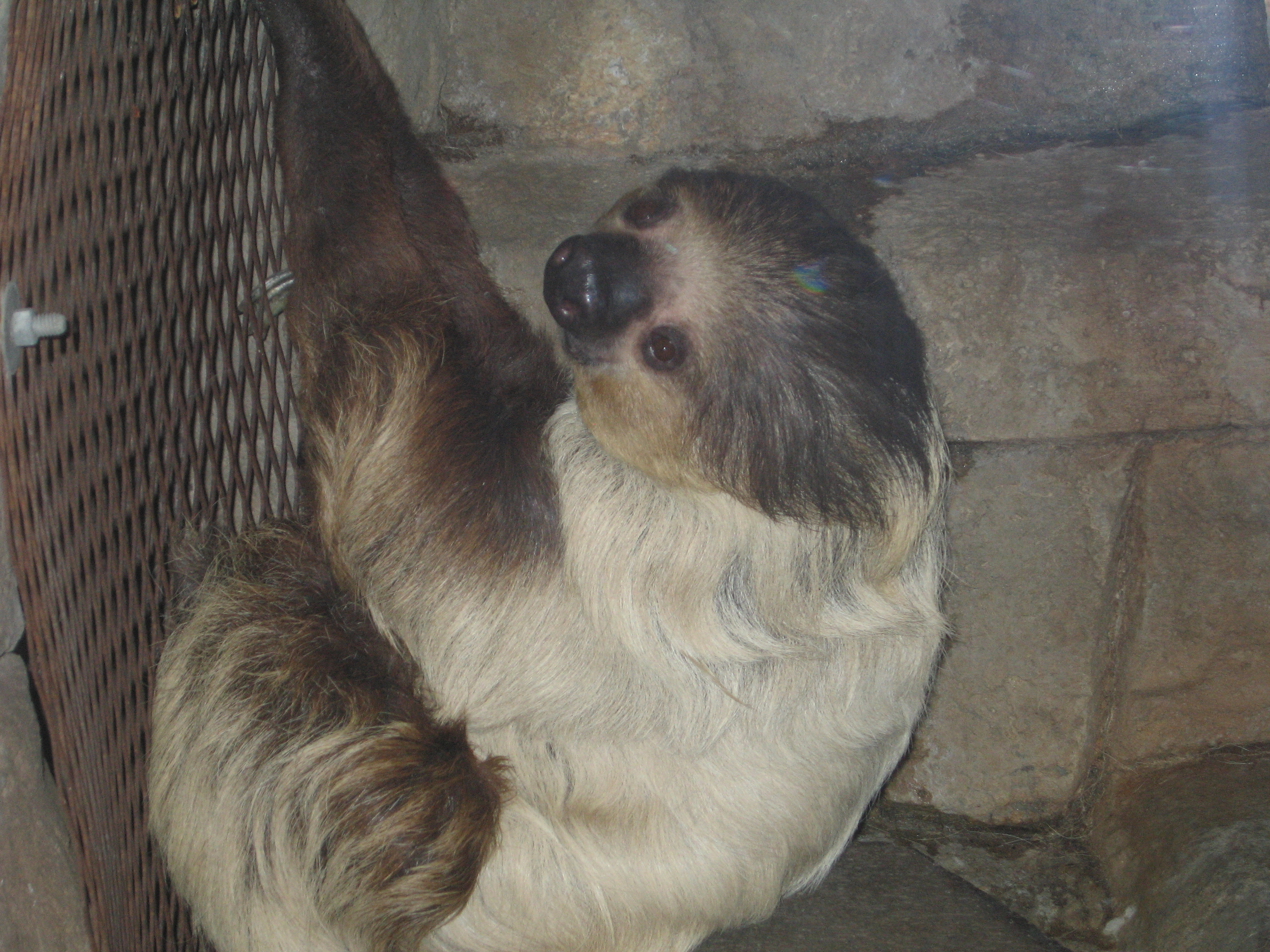
Hoffmann's two-toed sloth

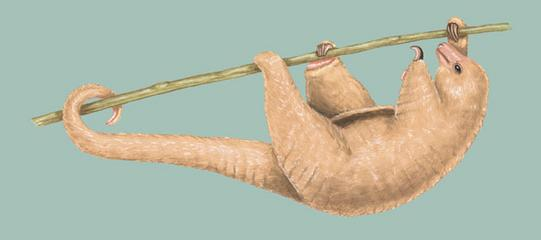
Silky anteater

The order Pilosa is extant only in the Americas and includes the anteaters, sloths, and tamanduas.

- Suborder: Folivora
  - Family: Bradypodidae (three-toed sloths)
    - Genus: Bradypus
      - Pale-throated three-toed sloth, Bradypus tridactylus LC
      - Brown-throated three-toed sloth, Bradypus variegatus LC
  - Family: Choloepodidae (two-toed sloths)
    - Genus: Choloepus
      - Linnaeus's two-toed sloth, Choloepus didactylus LC
      - Hoffmann's two-toed sloth, Choloepus hoffmanni LC
- Suborder: Vermilingua
  - Family: Cyclopedidae
    - Genus: Cyclopes
      - Silky anteater, Cyclopes didactylus LC
  - Family: Myrmecophagidae (American anteaters)
    - Genus: Myrmecophaga
      - Giant anteater, Myrmecophaga tridactyla NT
    - Genus: Tamandua
      - Northern tamandua, Tamandua mexicana LC
      - Southern tamandua, Tamandua tetradactyla LC

==== Order: Primates ====
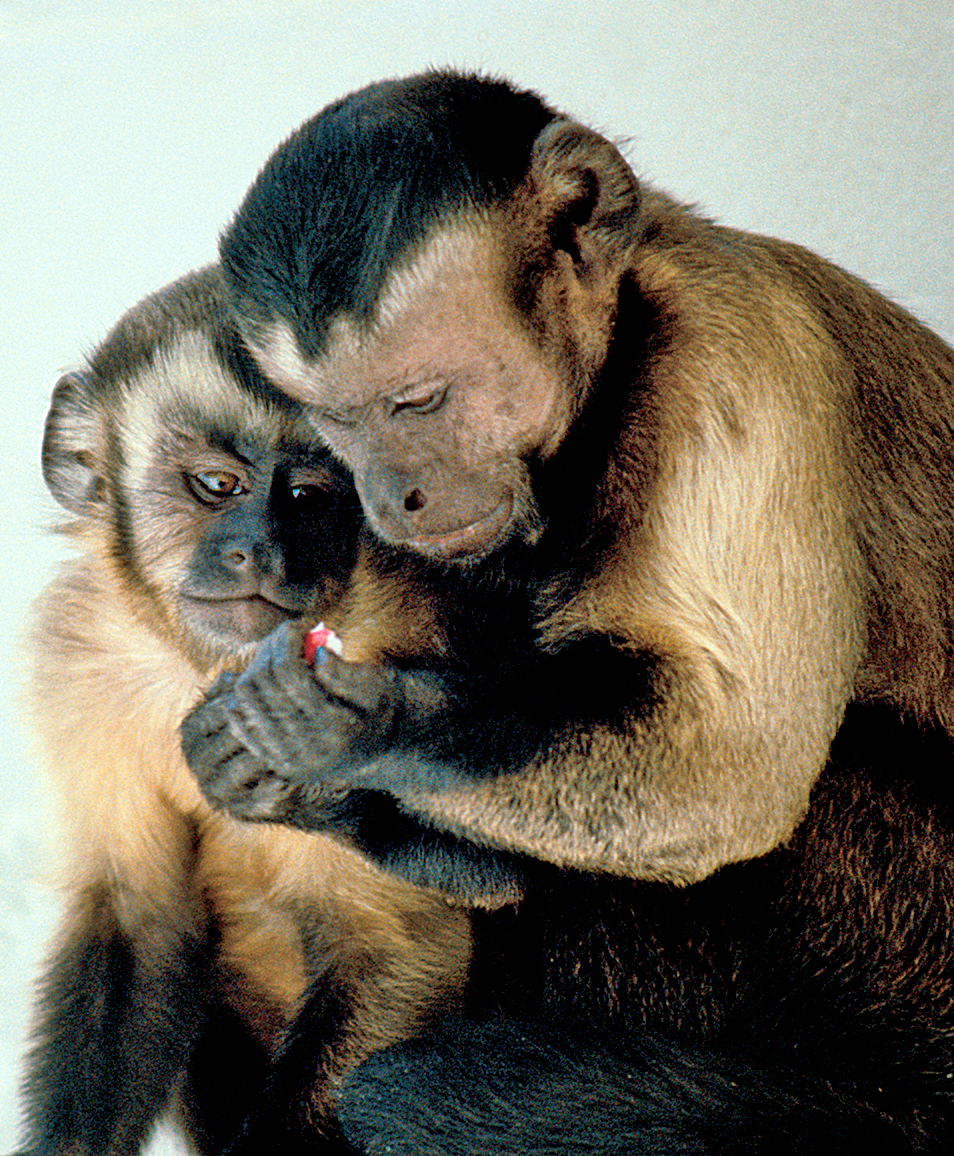
Tufted capuchin

The order Primates contains humans and their closest relatives: lemurs, lorisoids, monkeys, and apes.

- Suborder: Haplorhini
  - Infraorder: Simiiformes
    - Parvorder: Platyrrhini (New World monkeys)
      - Family: Cebidae
        - Subfamily: Callitrichinae
          - Genus: Saguinus
            - Red-handed tamarin, Saguinus midas LC
        - Subfamily: Cebinae
          - Genus: Cebus
            - Humboldt's white-fronted capuchin, Cebus albifrons LC
            - Venezuelan brown capuchin, Cebus brunneus LC
            - Sierra de Perijá white-fronted capuchin, Cebus leucocephalus
            - Weeper capuchin, Cebus olivaceus LC
          - Genus: Sapajus
            - Tufted capuchin, Sapajus apella LC
          - Genus: Saimiri
            - Guianan squirrel monkey, Saimiri sciureus LC
            - Humboldt's squirrel monkey, Saimiri cassiquiarensis
      - Family: Aotidae
        - Genus: Aotus
          - Three-striped night monkey, Aotus trivirgatus LC
      - Family: Pitheciidae
        - Subfamily: Callicebinae
          - Genus: Callicebus
            - Black titi, Callicebus lugens LC
        - Subfamily: Pitheciinae
          - Genus: Pithecia
            - White-faced saki, Pithecia pithecia LC
          - Genus: Chiropotes
            - Red-backed bearded saki, Chiropotes chiropotes LC
          - Genus: Cacajao
            - Black-headed uakari, Cacajao melanocephalus LC
      - Family: Atelidae
        - Subfamily: Alouattinae
          - Genus: Alouatta
            - Venezuelan red howler, Alouatta seniculus LC
        - Subfamily: Atelinae
          - Genus: Ateles
            - White-fronted spider monkey, Ateles belzebuth VU
            - Brown spider monkey, Ateles hybridus CR
            - Red-faced spider monkey, Ateles paniscus LC
          - Genus: Lagothrix
            - Brown woolly monkey, Lagothrix lagothricha LR/lc
            - Colombian woolly monkey, Lagothrix lugens VU

==== Order: Rodentia (rodents) ====
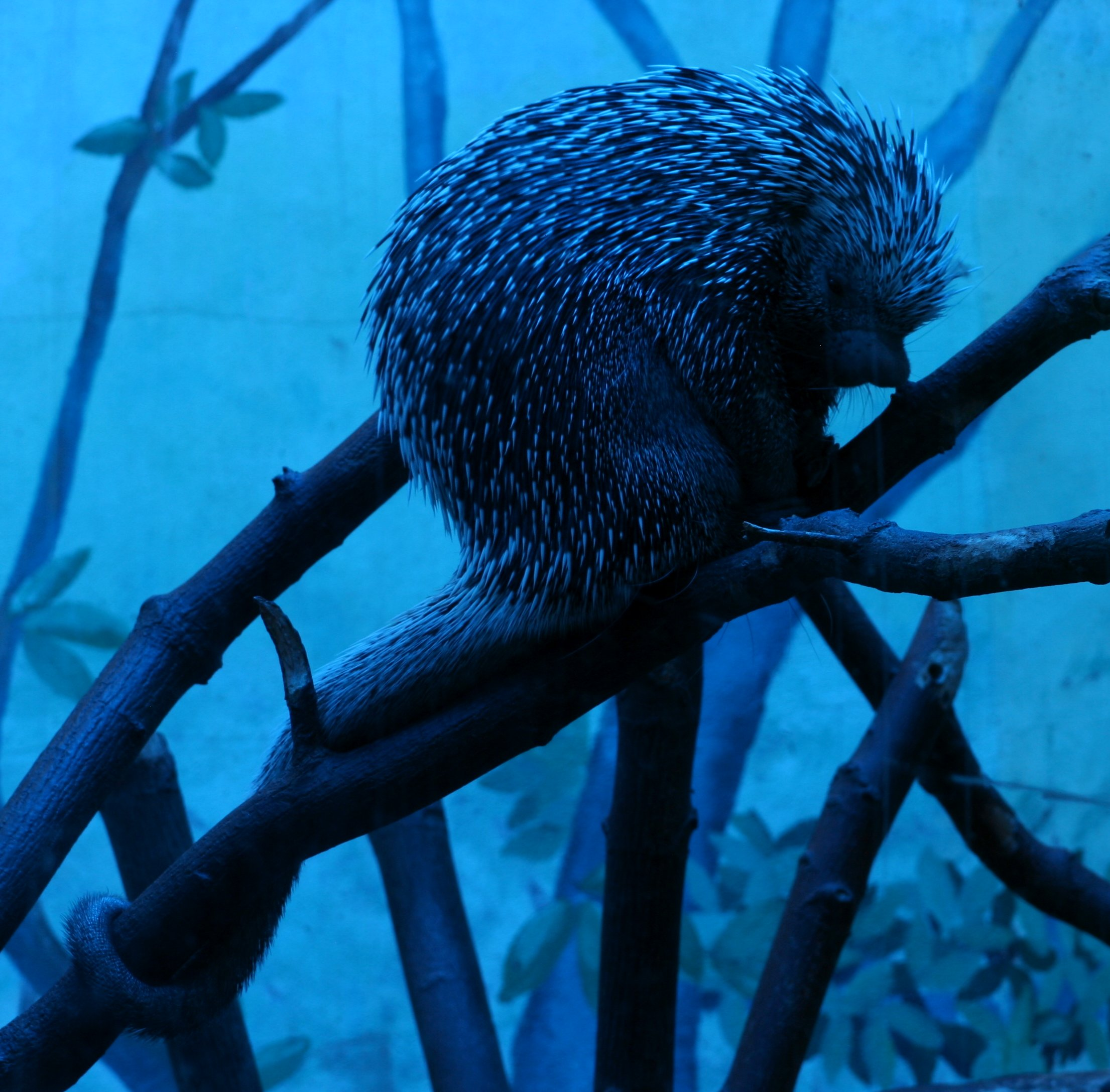
Brazilian porcupine

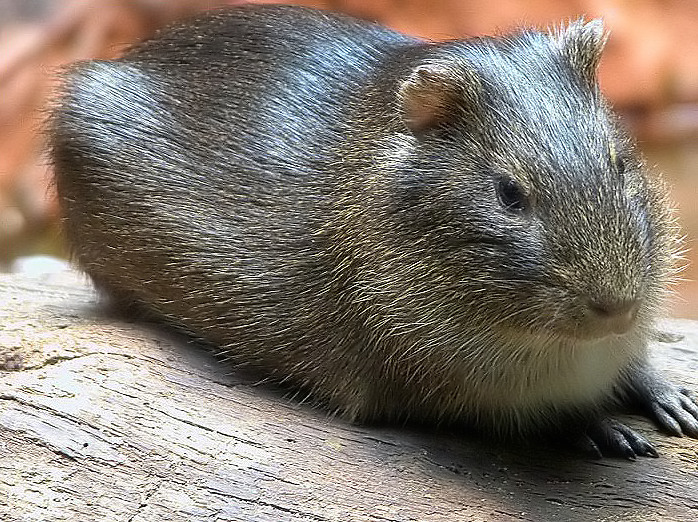
Brazilian guinea pig

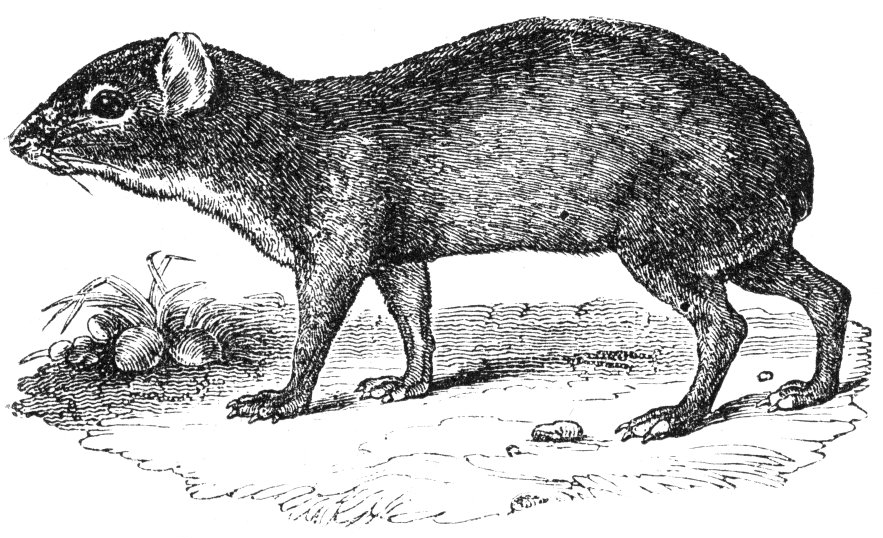
Black agouti

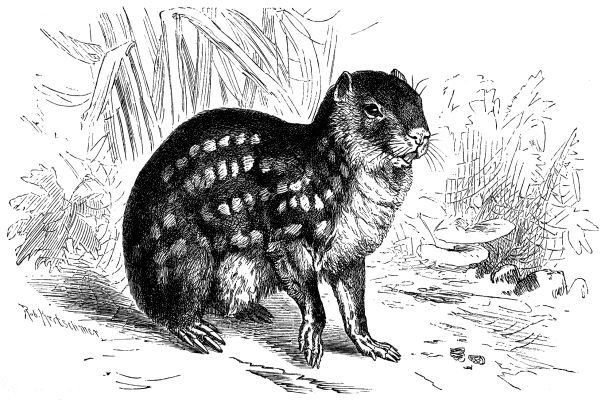
Lowland paca

Rodents make up the largest order of mammals, with over 40% of mammalian species. They have two incisors in the upper and lower jaw which grow continually and must be kept short by gnawing. Most rodents are small though the capybara can weigh up to 45 kg (99 lb).

- Suborder: Hystricognathi
  - Family: Erethizontidae (New World porcupines)
    - Subfamily: Erethizontinae
      - Genus: Coendou
        - Brazilian porcupine, Coendou prehensilis LR/lc
        - Brown hairy dwarf porcupine, Coendou vestitus VU
  - Family: Dinomyidae (pacarana)
    - Genus: Dinomys
      - Pacarana, Dinomys branickii EN
  - Family: Caviidae (guinea pigs)
    - Subfamily: Caviinae
      - Genus: Cavia
        - Brazilian guinea pig, Cavia aperea LR/lc
    - Subfamily: Hydrochoerinae (capybaras and rock cavies)
      - Genus: Hydrochoerus
        - Capybara, Hydrochoerus hydrochaeris LR/lc
  - Family: Dasyproctidae (agoutis and pacas)
    - Genus: Dasyprocta
      - Black agouti, Dasyprocta fuliginosa LR/lc
      - Orinoco agouti, Dasyprocta guamara LR/lc
      - Red-rumped agouti, Dasyprocta leporina LR/lc
      - Central American agouti, Dasyprocta punctata LR/lc
    - Genus: Myoprocta
      - Red acouchi, Myoprocta acouchy LR/lc
  - Family: Cuniculidae
    - Genus: Cuniculus
      - Lowland paca, Cuniculus paca LC
      - Mountain paca, Cuniculus taczanowskii NT
  - Family: Echimyidae
    - Subfamily: Dactylomyinae
      - Genus: Olallamys
        - Greedy olalla rat, Olallamys edax LR/nt
    - Subfamily: Echimyinae
      - Genus: Echimys
        - Speckled spiny tree-rat, Echimys semivillosus LR/lc
      - Genus: Isothrix
        - Yellow-crowned brush-tailed rat, Isothrix bistriata LR/nt
      - Genus: Makalata
        - Brazilian spiny tree-rat, Makalata armata LR/lc
    - Subfamily: Eumysopinae
      - Genus: Mesomys
        - Ferreira's spiny tree-rat, Mesomys hispidus LR/lc
      - Genus: Proechimys
        - Napo spiny rat, Proechimys amphichoricus LR/lc
        - Colombian spiny rat, Proechimys canicollis LR/lc
        - Guyenne spiny rat, Proechimys cayennensis LR/lc
        - Guaira spiny rat, Proechimys guairae LR/lc
        - Guyanan spiny rat, Proechimys hoplomyoides LR/lc
        - Gray-footed spiny rat, Proechimys poliopus LR/lc
        - Napo spiny rat, Proechimys quadruplicatus LR/lc
        - Sucre spiny rat, Proechimys urichi LR/lc
- Suborder: Sciurognathi
  - Family: Sciuridae (squirrels)
    - Subfamily: Sciurinae
      - Tribe: Sciurini
        - Genus: Sciurus
          - Brazilian squirrel, Sciurus aestuans LR/lc
          - Fiery squirrel, Sciurus flammifer LR/lc
          - Yellow-throated squirrel, Sciurus gilvigularis LR/lc
          - Red-tailed squirrel, Sciurus granatensis LR/lc
          - Northern Amazon red squirrel, Sciurus igniventris LR/lc
  - Family: Heteromyidae
    - Subfamily: Heteromyinae
      - Genus: Heteromys
        - Trinidad spiny pocket mouse, Heteromys anomalus LR/lc
  - Family: Cricetidae
    - Subfamily: Sigmodontinae
      - Genus: Aepeomys
        - Olive montane mouse, Aepeomys lugens LR/lc
      - Genus: Akodon
        - Bogotá grass mouse, Akodon bogotensis LR/lc
        - Northern grass mouse, Akodon urichi LR/lc
      - Genus: Calomys
        - Hummelinck's vesper mouse, Calomys hummelincki LR/lc
      - Genus: Chibchanomys
        - Chibchan water mouse, Chibchanomys trichotis LR/nt
      - Genus: Chilomys
        - Colombian forest mouse, Chilomys instans LR/lc
      - Genus: Holochilus
        - Amazonian marsh rat, Holochilus sciureus LR/lc
      - Genus: Ichthyomys
        - Crab-eating rat, Ichthyomys hydrobates LR/nt
        - Pittier's crab-eating rat, Ichthyomys pittieri VU
      - Genus: Melanomys
        - Dusky rice rat, Melanomys caliginosus LR/lc
      - Genus: Microryzomys
        - Forest small rice rat, Microryzomys minutus LR/lc
      - Genus: Neacomys
        - Guiana bristly mouse, Neacomys guianae LR/lc
        - Common bristly mouse, Neacomys spinosus LR/lc
        - Narrow-footed bristly mouse, Neacomys tenuipes LR/lc
      - Genus: Nectomys
        - Trinidad water rat, Nectomys palmipes LR/lc
        - Scaly-footed water rat, Nectomys squamipes LR/lc
      - Genus: Neusticomys
        - Musso's fish-eating rat, Neusticomys mussoi EN
        - Venezuelan fish-eating rat, Neusticomys venezuelae EN
      - Genus: Oecomys
        - Bicolored arboreal rice rat, Oecomys bicolor LR/lc
        - Unicolored arboreal rice rat, Oecomys concolor LR/lc
        - Yellow arboreal rice rat, Oecomys flavicans LR/lc
        - Brazilian arboreal rice rat, Oecomys paricola LR/lc
        - King arboreal rice rat, Oecomys rex LR/lc
        - Robert's arboreal rice rat, Oecomys roberti LR/lc
        - Red arboreal rice rat, Oecomys rutilus LR/lc
        - Savanna arboreal rice rat, Oecomys speciosus LR/lc
        - Trinidad arboreal rice rat, Oecomys trinitatis LR/lc
      - Genus: Oligoryzomys
        - Fulvous pygmy rice rat, Oligoryzomys fulvescens LR/lc
        - Grayish pygmy rice rat, Oligoryzomys griseolus LR/lc
      - Genus: Oryzomys
        - MacConnell's rice rat, Oryzomys macconnelli LR/lc
        - Azara's broad-headed rice rat, Oryzomys megacephalus LR/lc
        - Talamancan rice rat, Oryzomys talamancae LR/lc
        - Yungas rice rat, Oryzomys yunganus LR/lc
      - Genus: Rhipidomys
        - Coues's climbing mouse, Rhipidomys couesi LR/lc
        - Buff-bellied climbing mouse, Rhipidomys fulviventer LR/lc
        - MacConnell's climbing mouse, Rhipidomys macconnelli LR/lc
        - Atlantic Forest climbing mouse, Rhipidomys mastacalis LR/lc
        - Splendid climbing mouse, Rhipidomys nitela LR/lc
        - Venezuelan climbing mouse, Rhipidomys venezuelae LR/lc
        - Charming climbing mouse, Rhipidomys venustus LR/lc
        - Wetzel's climbing mouse, Rhipidomys wetzeli LR/lc
      - Genus: Sigmodon
        - Alston's cotton rat, Sigmodon alstoni LR/lc
        - Southern cotton rat, Sigmodon hirsutus LC
      - Genus: Sigmodontomys
        - Alfaro's rice water rat, Sigmodontomys alfari LR/lc
      - Genus: Thomasomys
        - Golden Oldfield mouse, Thomasomys aureus LR/lc
        - Woodland Oldfield mouse, Thomasomys hylophilus LR/lc
        - Soft-furred Oldfield mouse, Thomasomys laniger LR/lc
        - Dressy Oldfield mouse, Thomasomys vestitus LR/lc
      - Genus: Zygodontomys
        - Short-tailed cane rat, Zygodontomys brevicauda LR/lc

==== Order: Lagomorpha (lagomorphs) ====
The lagomorphs comprise two families, Leporidae (hares and rabbits), and Ochotonidae (pikas). Though they can resemble rodents, and were classified as a superfamily in that order until the early 20th century, they have since been considered a separate order. They differ from rodents in a number of physical characteristics, such as having four incisors in the upper jaw rather than two.

- Family: Leporidae (rabbits, hares)
  - Genus: Sylvilagus
    - Common tapetí, Sylvilagus brasiliensis EN
    - Eastern cottontail, Sylvilagus floridanus LR/lc
    - Venezuelan lowland rabbit, Sylvilagus varynaensis DD

==== Order: Eulipotyphla (shrews, hedgehogs, moles, and solenodons) ====
Eulipotyphlans are insectivorous mammals. Shrews and solenodons closely resemble mice, hedgehogs carry spines, while moles are stout-bodied burrowers.

- Family: Soricidae (shrews)
  - Subfamily: Soricinae
    - Tribe: Blarinini
      - Genus: Cryptotis
        - Merida small-eared shrew, Cryptotis meridensis LR/lc

==== Order: Chiroptera (bats) ====
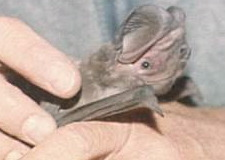
Western mastiff bat

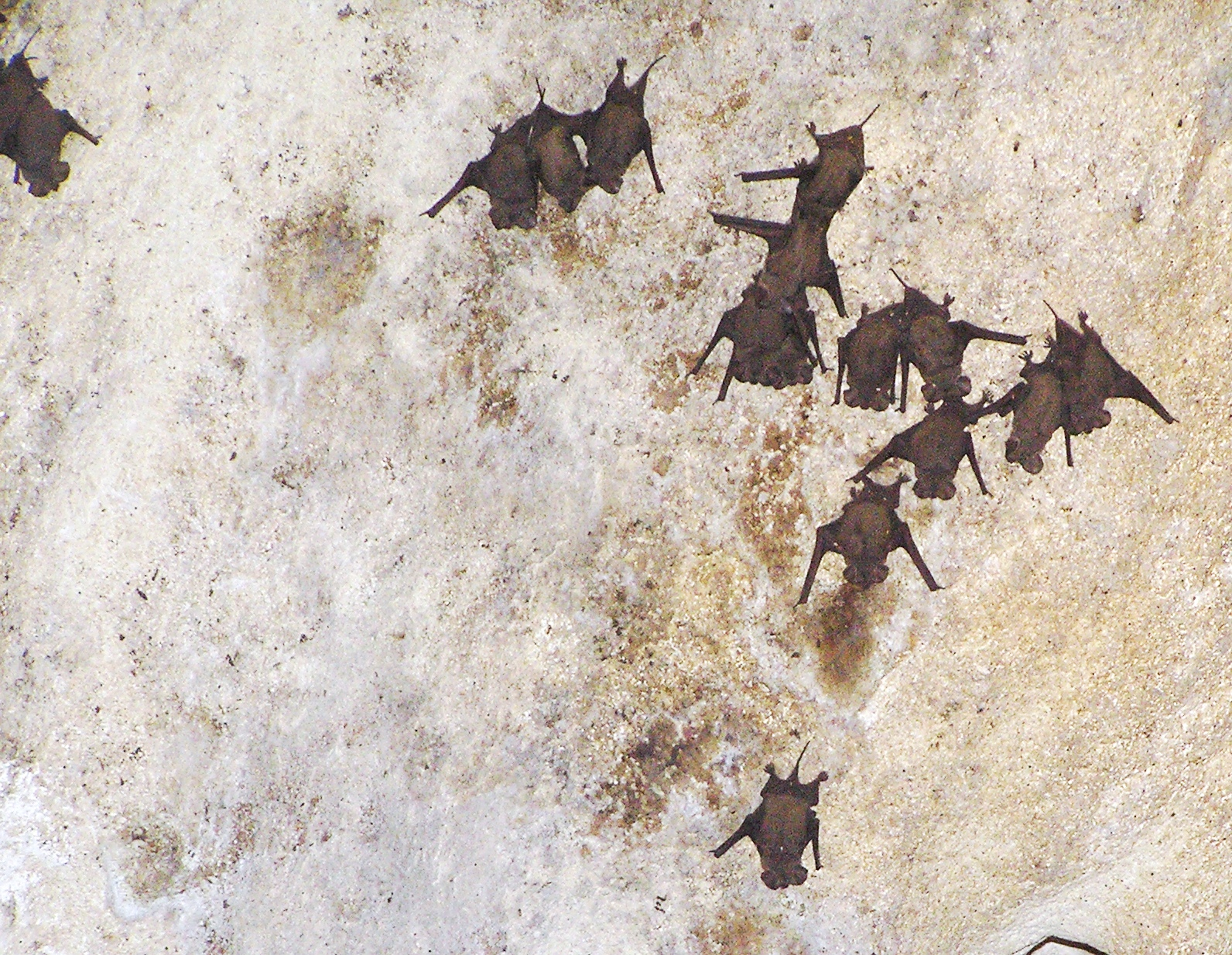
Mexican free-tailed bats

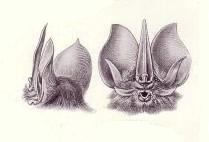
Tomes's sword-nosed bat

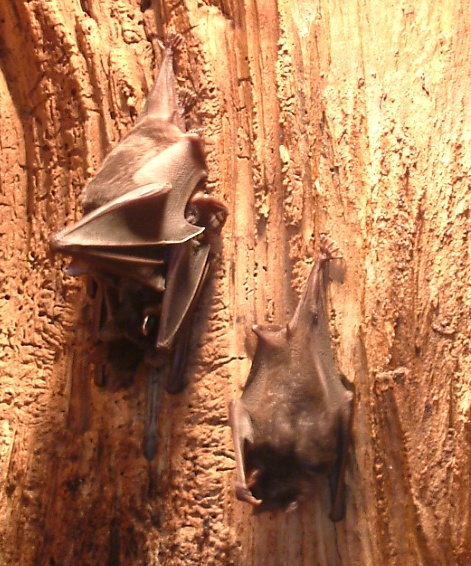
Pale spear-nosed bat

The bats' most distinguishing feature is that their forelimbs are developed as wings, making them the only mammals capable of flight. Bat species account for about 20% of all mammals.

- Family: Noctilionidae
  - Genus: Noctilio
    - Lesser bulldog bat, Noctilio albiventris LR/lc
    - Greater bulldog bat, Noctilio leporinus LR/lc
- Family: Vespertilionidae
  - Subfamily: Myotinae
    - Genus: Myotis
      - Silver-tipped myotis, Myotis albescens LR/lc
      - Hairy-legged myotis, Myotis keaysi LR/lc
      - Curacao myotis, Myotis nesopolus LR/nt
      - Black myotis, Myotis nigricans LR/lc
      - Montane myotis, Myotis oxyotus LR/lc
      - Riparian myotis, Myotis riparius LR/lc
  - Subfamily: Vespertilioninae
    - Genus: Eptesicus
      - Little black serotine LR/lc
      - Brazilian brown bat, Eptesicus brasiliensis LR/lc
      - Diminutive serotine, Eptesicus diminutus LR/lc
      - Argentine brown bat, Eptesicus furinalis LR/lc
      - Big brown bat, Eptesicus fuscus LR/lc
    - Genus: Histiotus
      - Humboldt big-eared brown bat, Histiotus humboldti DD
      - Small big-eared brown bat, Histiotus montanus LR/lc
    - Genus: Lasiurus
      - Desert red bat, Lasiurus blossevillii LR/lc
      - Hoary bat, Lasiurus cinereus LR/lc
      - Southern yellow bat, Lasiurus ega LR/lc
    - Genus: Rhogeessa
      - Tiny yellow bat, Rhogeessa minutilla LR/nt
- Family: Molossidae
  - Genus: Cynomops
    - Cinnamon dog-faced bat, Cynomops abrasus LR/nt
    - Greenhall's dog-faced bat, Cynomops greenhalli LR/lc
    - Southern dog-faced bat, Cynomops planirostris LR/lc
  - Genus: Eumops
    - Dwarf bonneted bat, Eumops bonariensis LR/lc
    - Big bonneted bat, Eumops dabbenei LR/lc
    - Wagner's bonneted bat, Eumops glaucinus LR/lc
    - Sanborn's bonneted bat, Eumops hansae LR/lc
    - Western mastiff bat, Eumops perotis LR/lc
  - Genus: Molossops
    - Mato Grosso dog-faced bat, Molossops mattogrossensis LR/nt
    - Rufous dog-faced bat, Molossops neglectus LR/nt
    - Dwarf dog-faced bat, Molossops temminckii LR/lc
  - Genus: Molossus
    - Bonda mastiff bat, Molossus bondae LR/lc
    - Coiban mastiff bat, Molossus coibensis LR/nt
    - Velvety free-tailed bat, Molossus molossus LR/lc
    - Miller's mastiff bat, Molossus pretiosus LR/lc
    - Sinaloan mastiff bat, Molossus sinaloae LR/lc
  - Genus: Nyctinomops
    - Peale's free-tailed bat, Nyctinomops aurispinosus LR/lc
    - Broad-eared bat, Nyctinomops laticaudatus LR/lc
    - Big free-tailed bat, Nyctinomops macrotis LR/lc
  - Genus: Promops
    - Big crested mastiff bat, Promops centralis LR/lc
    - Brown mastiff bat, Promops nasutus LR/lc
  - Genus: Tadarida
    - Mexican free-tailed bat, Tadarida brasiliensis LR/nt
- Family: Emballonuridae
  - Genus: Centronycteris
    - Shaggy bat, Centronycteris maximiliani LR/lc
  - Genus: Cormura
    - Wagner's sac-winged bat, Cormura brevirostris LR/lc
  - Genus: Diclidurus
    - Greater ghost bat, Diclidurus ingens VU
    - Isabelle's ghost bat, Diclidurus isabella LR/nt
    - Lesser ghost bat, Diclidurus scutatus LR/lc
  - Genus: Peropteryx
    - Greater dog-like bat, Peropteryx kappleri LR/lc
    - White-winged dog-like bat, Peropteryx leucoptera LR/lc
    - Lesser doglike bat, Peropteryx macrotis LR/lc
  - Genus: Rhynchonycteris
    - Proboscis bat, Rhynchonycteris naso LR/lc
  - Genus: Saccopteryx
    - Greater sac-winged bat, Saccopteryx bilineata LR/lc
    - Frosted sac-winged bat, Saccopteryx canescens LR/lc
    - Amazonian sac-winged bat, Saccopteryx gymnura VU
    - Lesser sac-winged bat, Saccopteryx leptura LR/lc
- Family: Mormoopidae
  - Genus: Mormoops
    - Ghost-faced bat, Mormoops megalophylla LR/lc
  - Genus: Pteronotus
    - Naked-backed bat, Pteronotus davyi LR/lc
    - Big naked-backed bat, Pteronotus gymnonotus LR/lc
    - Parnell's mustached bat, Pteronotus parnellii LR/lc
    - Wagner's mustached bat, Pteronotus personatus LR/lc
- Family: Phyllostomidae
  - Subfamily: Phyllostominae
    - Genus: Glyphonycteris
      - Davies's big-eared bat, Glyphonycteris daviesi LR/nt
      - Tricolored big-eared bat, Glyphonycteris sylvestris LR/nt
    - Genus: Lampronycteris
      - Yellow-throated big-eared bat, Lampronycteris brachyotis LR/lc
    - Genus: Lonchorhina
      - Tomes's sword-nosed bat, Lonchorhina aurita LR/lc
      - Fernandez's sword-nosed bat, Lonchorhina fernandezi VU
      - Northern sword-nosed bat, Lonchorhina inusitata DD
      - Orinoco sword-nosed bat, Lonchorhina orinocensis LR/nt
    - Genus: Lophostoma
      - Pygmy round-eared bat, Lophostoma brasiliense LR/lc
      - Carriker's round-eared bat, Lophostoma carrikeri VU
      - White-throated round-eared bat, Lophostoma silvicolum LR/lc
    - Genus: Macrophyllum
      - Long-legged bat, Macrophyllum macrophyllum LR/lc
    - Genus: Micronycteris
      - Hairy big-eared bat, Micronycteris hirsuta LR/lc
      - Little big-eared bat, Micronycteris megalotis LR/lc
      - White-bellied big-eared bat, Micronycteris minuta LR/lc
      - Schmidts's big-eared bat, Micronycteris schmidtorum LR/lc
    - Genus: Mimon
      - Striped hairy-nosed bat, Mimon crenulatum LR/lc
    - Genus: Phylloderma
      - Pale-faced bat, Phylloderma stenops LR/lc
    - Genus: Phyllostomus
      - Pale spear-nosed bat, Phyllostomus discolor LR/lc
      - Lesser spear-nosed bat, Phyllostomus elongatus LR/lc
      - Greater spear-nosed bat, Phyllostomus hastatus LR/lc
    - Genus: Tonatia
      - Stripe-headed round-eared bat, Tonatia saurophila LR/lc
    - Genus: Trachops
      - Fringe-lipped bat, Trachops cirrhosus LR/lc
    - Genus: Trinycteris
      - Niceforo's big-eared bat, Trinycteris nicefori LR/lc
    - Genus: Vampyrum
      - Spectral bat, Vampyrum spectrum LR/nt
  - Subfamily: Lonchophyllinae
    - Genus: Lionycteris
      - Chestnut long-tongued bat, Lionycteris spurrelli LR/lc
    - Genus: Lonchophylla
      - Orange nectar bat, Lonchophylla robusta LR/lc
      - Thomas's nectar bat, Lonchophylla thomasi LR/lc
  - Subfamily: Glossophaginae
    - Genus: Anoura
      - Tailed tailless bat, Anoura caudifer LR/lc
      - Handley's tailless bat, Anoura cultrata LR/lc
      - Geoffroy's tailless bat, Anoura geoffroyi LR/lc
      - Broad-toothed tailless bat, Anoura latidens LR/nt
      - Luis Manuel's tailless bat, Anoura luismanueli DD
    - Genus: Choeroniscus
      - Godman's long-tailed bat, Choeroniscus godmani LR/nt
      - Minor long-nosed long-tongued bat, Choeroniscus minor LR/lc
    - Genus: Glossophaga
      - Miller's long-tongued bat, Glossophaga longirostris LR/lc
      - Pallas's long-tongued bat, Glossophaga soricina LR/lc
    - Genus: Leptonycteris
      - Southern long-nosed bat, Leptonycteris curasoae VU
    - Genus: Lichonycteris
      - Dark long-tongued bat, Lichonycteris obscura LR/lc
    - Genus: Scleronycteris
      - Ega long-tongued bat, Scleronycteris ega VU
  - Subfamily: Carolliinae
    - Genus: Carollia
      - Chestnut short-tailed bat, Carollia castanea LR/lc
      - Seba's short-tailed bat, Carollia perspicillata LR/lc
    - Genus: Rhinophylla
      - Dwarf little fruit bat, Rhinophylla pumilio LR/lc
  - Subfamily: Stenodermatinae
    - Genus: Ametrida
      - Little white-shouldered bat, Ametrida centurio LR/lc
    - Genus: Artibeus
      - Large fruit-eating bat, Artibeus amplus LR/nt
      - Gervais's fruit-eating bat, Artibeus cinereus LR/lc
      - Brown fruit-eating bat, Artibeus concolor LR/nt
      - Great fruit-eating bat, Artibeus intermedius LR/lc
      - Jamaican fruit bat, Artibeus jamaicensis LR/lc
      - Great fruit-eating bat, Artibeus lituratus LR/lc
      - Dark fruit-eating bat, Artibeus obscurus LR/nt
      - Pygmy fruit-eating bat, Artibeus phaeotis LR/lc
      - Flat-faced fruit-eating bat, Artibeus planirostris LR/lc
    - Genus: Centurio
      - Wrinkle-faced bat, Centurio senex LR/lc
    - Genus: Chiroderma
      - Salvin's big-eyed bat, Chiroderma salvini LR/lc
      - Little big-eyed bat, Chiroderma trinitatum LR/lc
      - Hairy big-eyed bat, Chiroderma villosum LR/lc
    - Genus: Enchisthenes
      - Velvety fruit-eating bat, Enchisthenes hartii LR/lc
    - Genus: Mesophylla
      - MacConnell's bat, Mesophylla macconnelli LR/lc
    - Genus: Sphaeronycteris
      - Visored bat, Sphaeronycteris toxophyllum LR/lc
    - Genus: Sturnira
      - Aratathomas's yellow-shouldered bat, Sturnira aratathomasi LR/nt
      - Bidentate yellow-shouldered bat, Sturnira bidens LR/nt
      - Bogota yellow-shouldered bat, Sturnira bogotensis LR/lc
      - Hairy yellow-shouldered bat, Sturnira erythromos LR/lc
      - Little yellow-shouldered bat, Sturnira lilium LR/lc
      - Highland yellow-shouldered bat, Sturnira ludovici LR/lc
      - Tilda's yellow-shouldered bat, Sturnira tildae LR/lc
    - Genus: Uroderma
      - Tent-making bat, Uroderma bilobatum LR/lc
      - Brown tent-making bat, Uroderma magnirostrum LR/lc
    - Genus: Vampyressa
      - Bidentate yellow-eared bat, Vampyressa bidens LR/nt
      - Southern little yellow-eared bat, Vampyressa pusilla LR/lc
    - Genus: Vampyrodes
      - Great stripe-faced bat, Vampyrodes caraccioli LR/lc
    - Genus: Platyrrhinus
      - Eldorado broad-nosed bat, Platyrrhinus aurarius LR/nt
      - Short-headed broad-nosed bat, Platyrrhinus brachycephalus LR/lc
      - Heller's broad-nosed bat, Platyrrhinus helleri LR/lc
      - Shadowy broad-nosed bat, Platyrrhinus umbratus LR/nt
      - Greater broad-nosed bat, Platyrrhinus vittatus LR/lc
  - Subfamily: Desmodontinae
    - Genus: Desmodus
      - Common vampire bat, Desmodus rotundus LR/lc
    - Genus: Diaemus
      - White-winged vampire bat, Diaemus youngi LR/lc
    - Genus: Diphylla
      - Hairy-legged vampire bat, Diphylla ecaudata LR/nt
- Family: Furipteridae
  - Genus: Furipterus
    - Furipteridae, Furipterus horrens LR/lc
- Family: Thyropteridae
  - Genus: Thyroptera
    - Peters's disk-winged bat, Thyroptera discifera LR/lc
    - Spix's disk-winged bat, Thyroptera tricolor LR/lc

==== Order: Cetacea (whales) ====
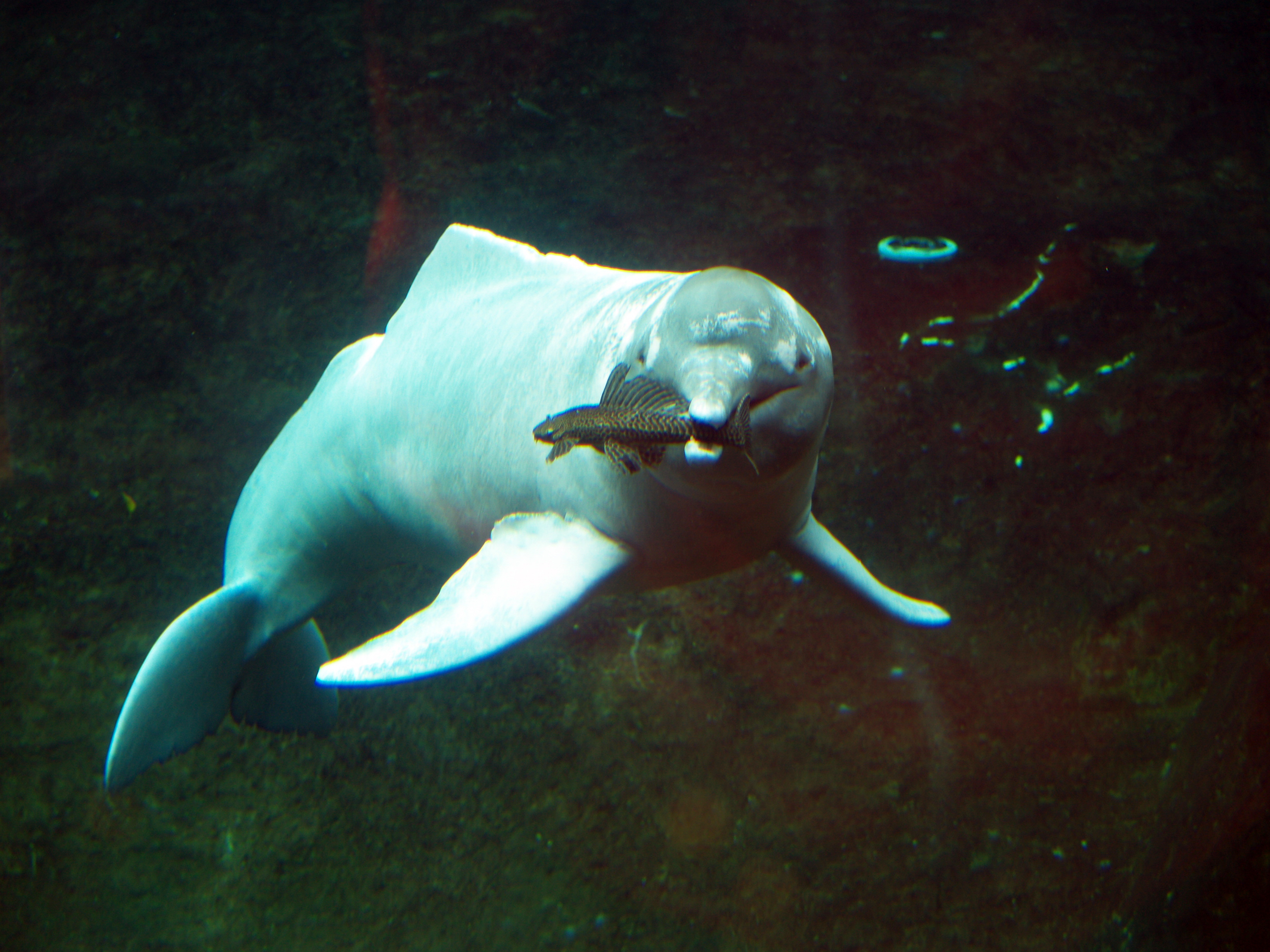
Amazon river dolphin

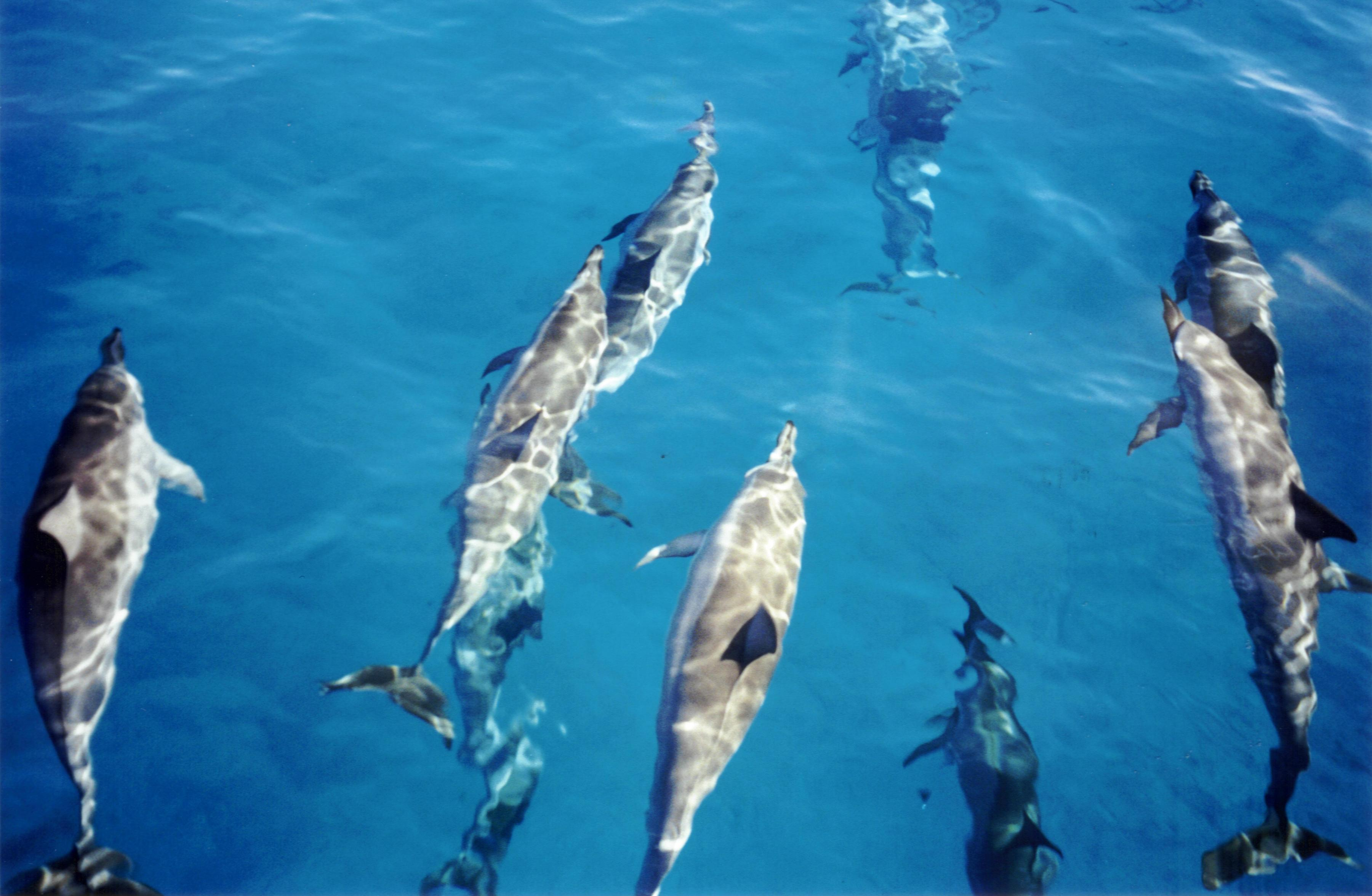
Spinner dolphins

The order Cetacea includes whales, dolphins and porpoises. They are the mammals most fully adapted to aquatic life with a spindle-shaped nearly hairless body, protected by a thick layer of blubber, and forelimbs and tail modified to provide propulsion underwater.

- Suborder: Mysticeti
  - Family: Balaenopteridae (baleen whales)
    - Genus: Balaenoptera
      - Common minke whale, Balaenoptera acutorostrata
      - Sei whale, Balaenoptera borealis
      - Bryde's whale, Balaenoptera brydei
      - Blue whale, Balaenoptera musculus
    - Genus: Megaptera
      - Humpback whale, Megaptera novaeangliae
- Suborder: Odontoceti
  - Superfamily: Platanistoidea
    - Family: Delphinidae (marine dolphins)
      - Genus: Delphinus
        - Short-beaked common dolphin, Delphinus delphis DD
      - Genus: Feresa
        - Pygmy killer whale, Feresa attenuata DD
      - Genus: Globicephala
        - Short-finned pilot whale, Globicephala macrorhyncus DD
      - Genus: Lagenodelphis
        - Fraser's dolphin, Lagenodelphis hosei DD
      - Genus: Grampus
        - Risso's dolphin, Grampus griseus DD
      - Genus: Orcinus
        - Killer whale, Orcinus orca DD
      - Genus: Peponocephala
        - Melon-headed whale, Peponocephala electra DD
      - Genus: Pseudorca
        - False killer whale, Pseudorca crassidens DD
      - Genus: Sotalia
        - Guiana dolphin, Sotalia guianensis DD
        - Tucuxi, Sotalia fluviatilis DD
        - Amazon river dolphin, Sotalia geoffrensis DD
      - Genus: Stenella
        - Pantropical spotted dolphin, Stenella attenuata DD
        - Clymene dolphin, Stenella clymene DD
        - Striped dolphin, Stenella coeruleoalba DD
        - Atlantic spotted dolphin, Stenella frontalis DD
        - Spinner dolphin, Stenella longirostris DD
      - Genus: Steno
        - Rough-toothed dolphin, Steno bredanensis DD
      - Genus: Tursiops
        - Common bottlenose dolphin, Tursiops truncatus
    - Family: Physeteridae (sperm whales)
      - Genus: Physeter
        - Sperm whale, Physeter catodon DD
    - Family: Kogiidae (dwarf sperm whales)
      - Genus: Kogia
        - Pygmy sperm whale, Kogia breviceps DD
        - Dwarf sperm whale, Kogia sima DD
  - Superfamily Ziphioidea
    - Family: Ziphidae (beaked whales)
      - Genus: Mesoplodon
        - Gervais' beaked whale, Mesoplodon europaeus DD)
      - Genus: Ziphius
        - Cuvier's beaked whale, Ziphius cavirostris DD

==== Order: Carnivora (carnivorans) ====
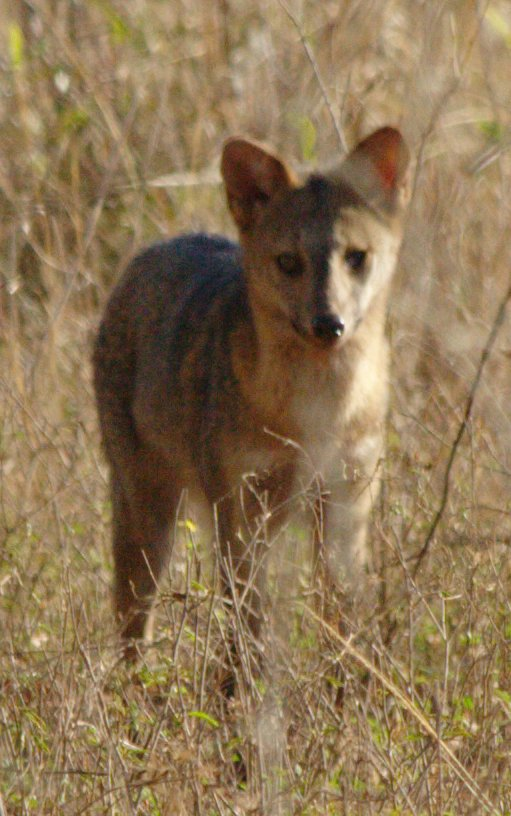
Crab-eating fox

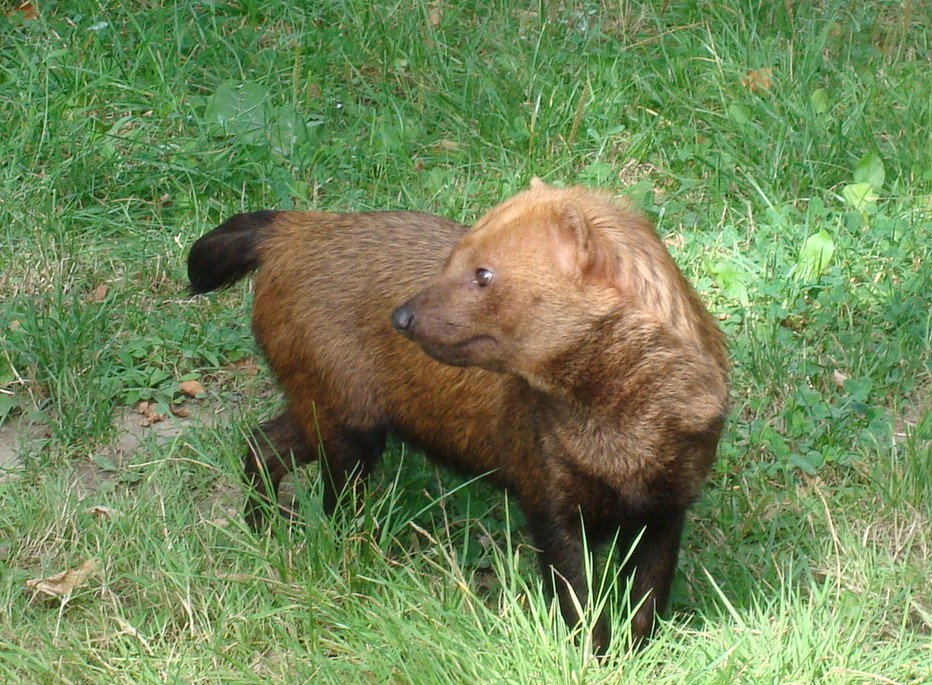
Bush dog

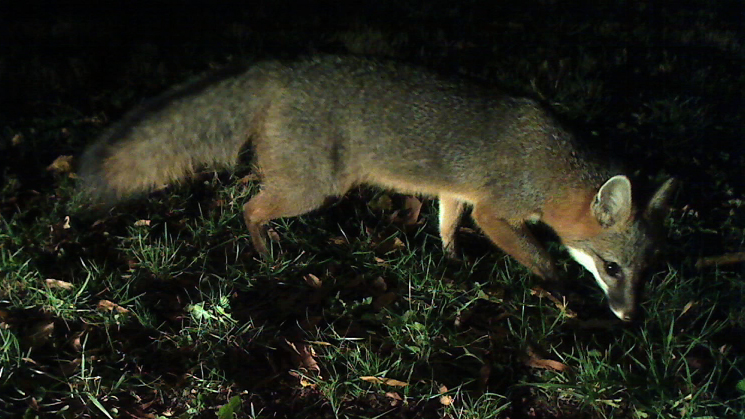
Gray fox

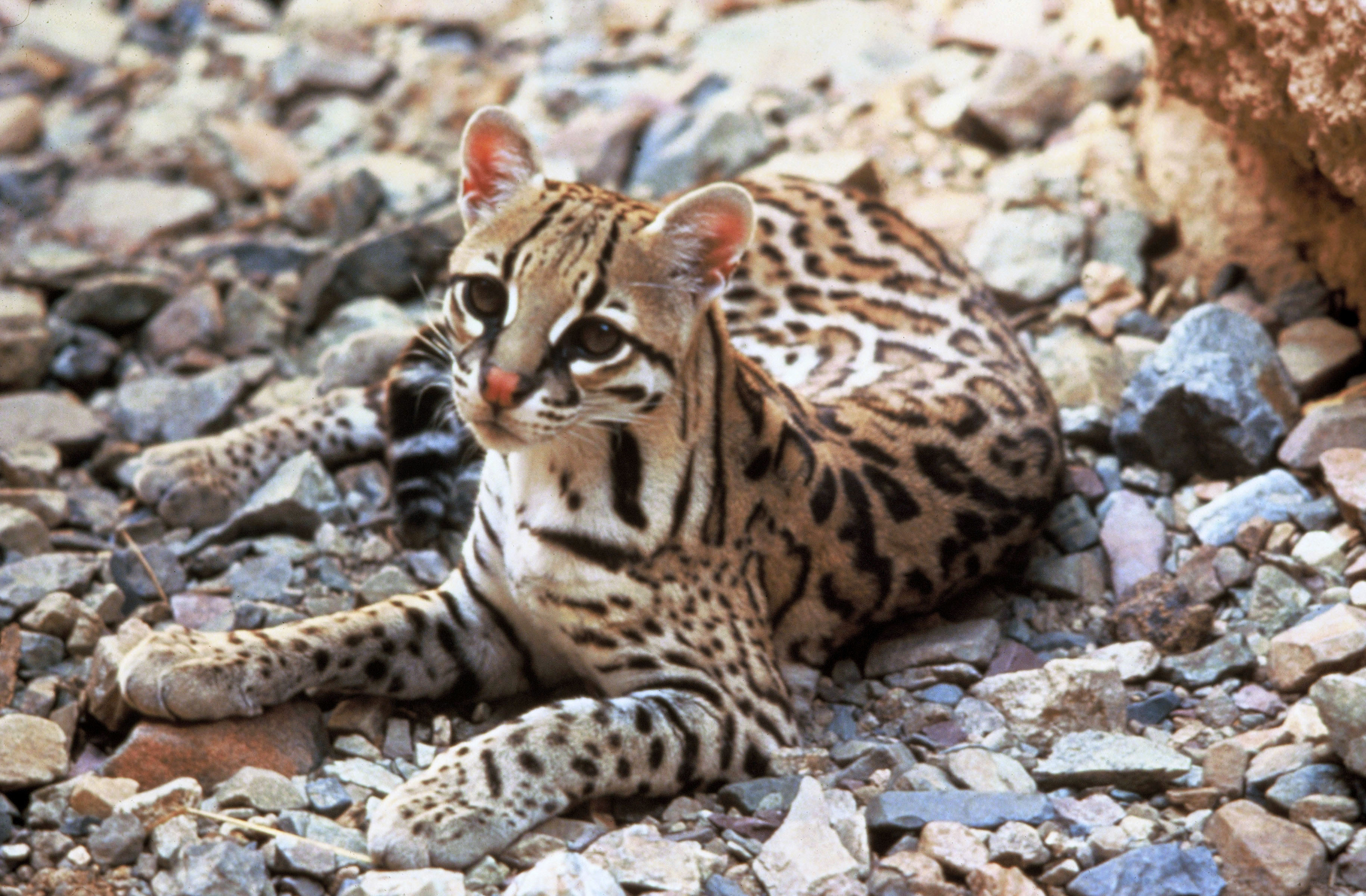
Ocelot

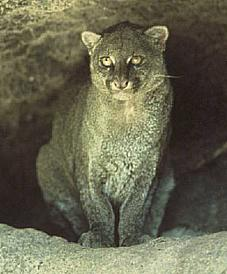
Jaguarundi

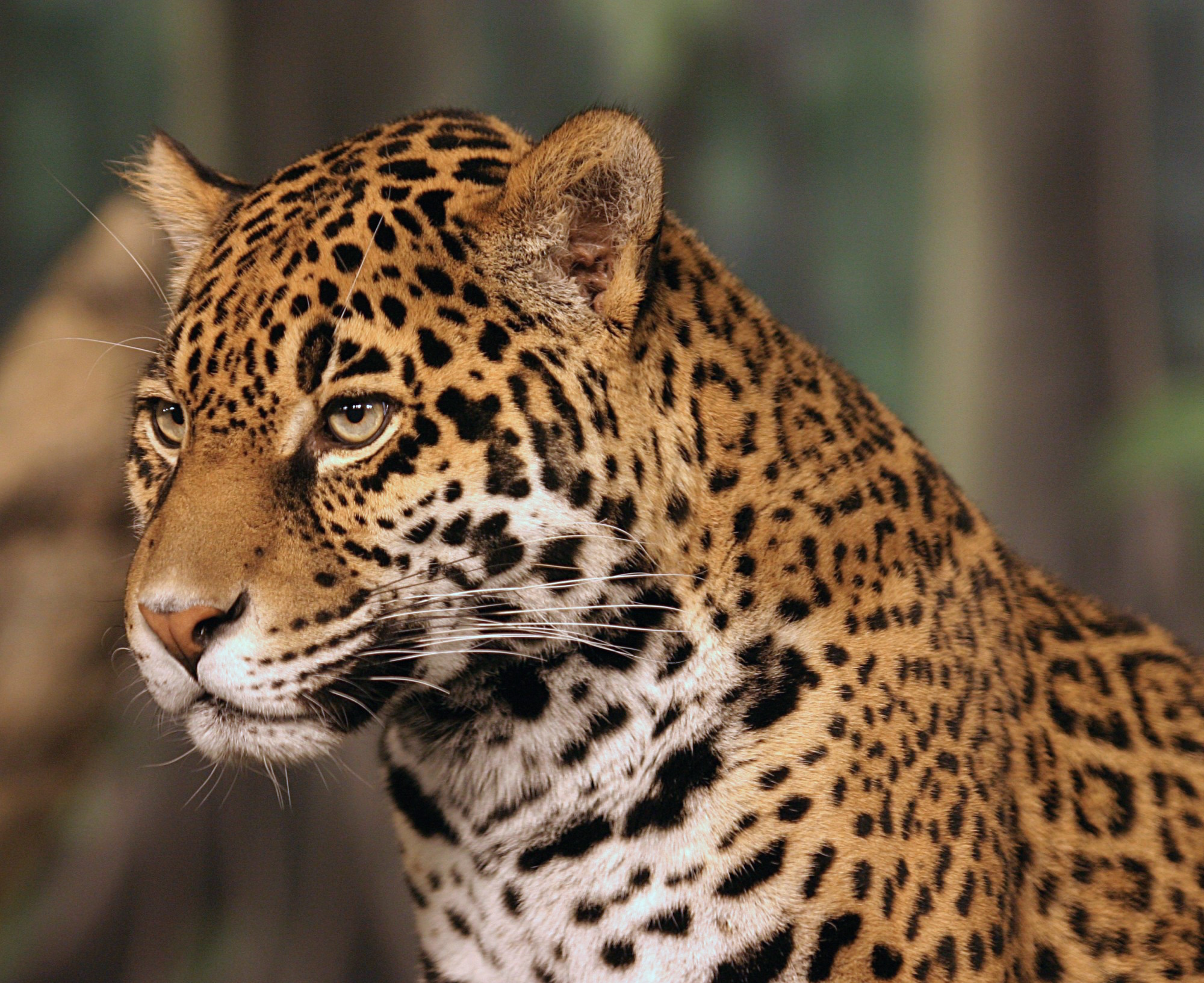
Jaguar

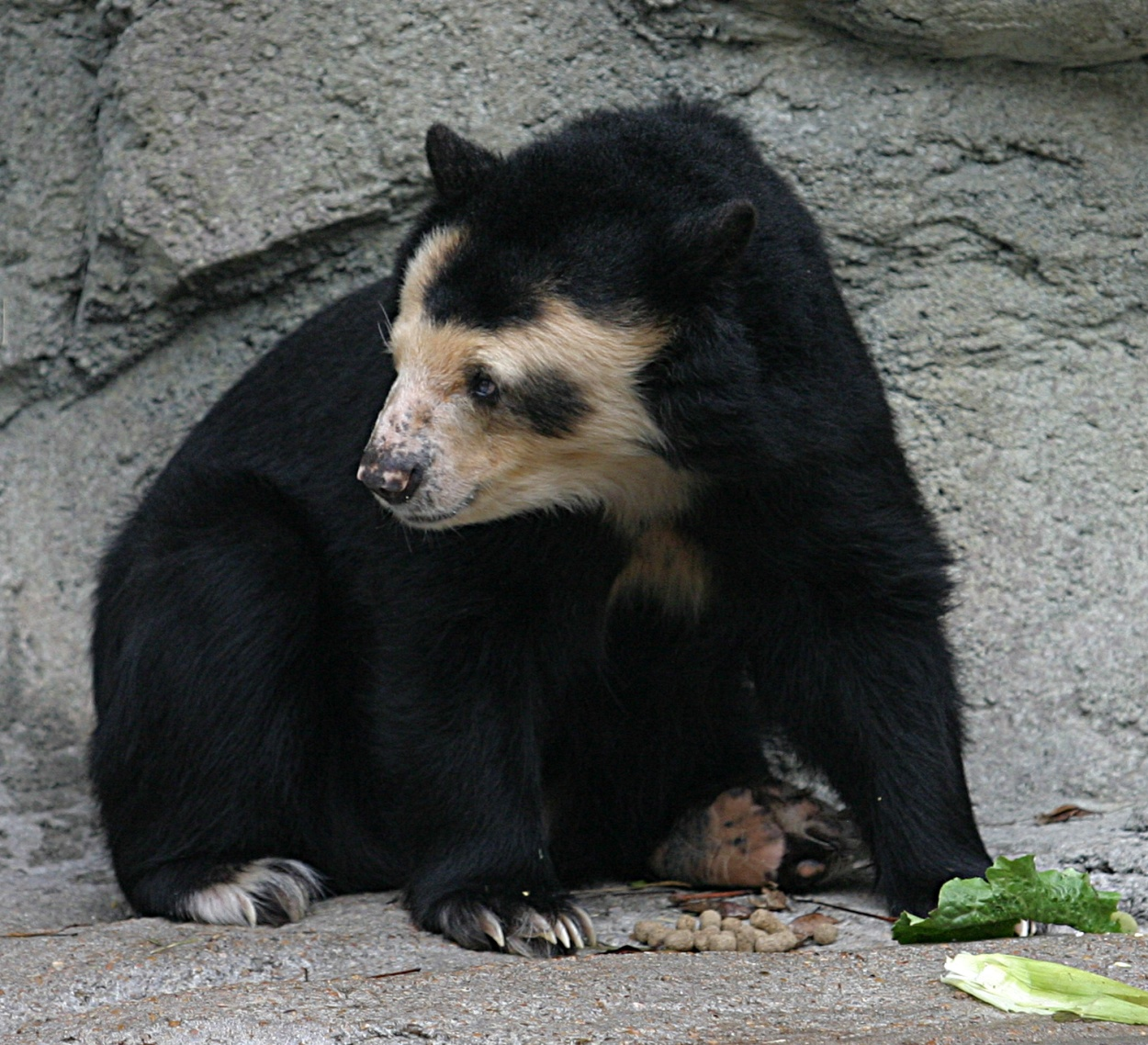
Spectacled bear

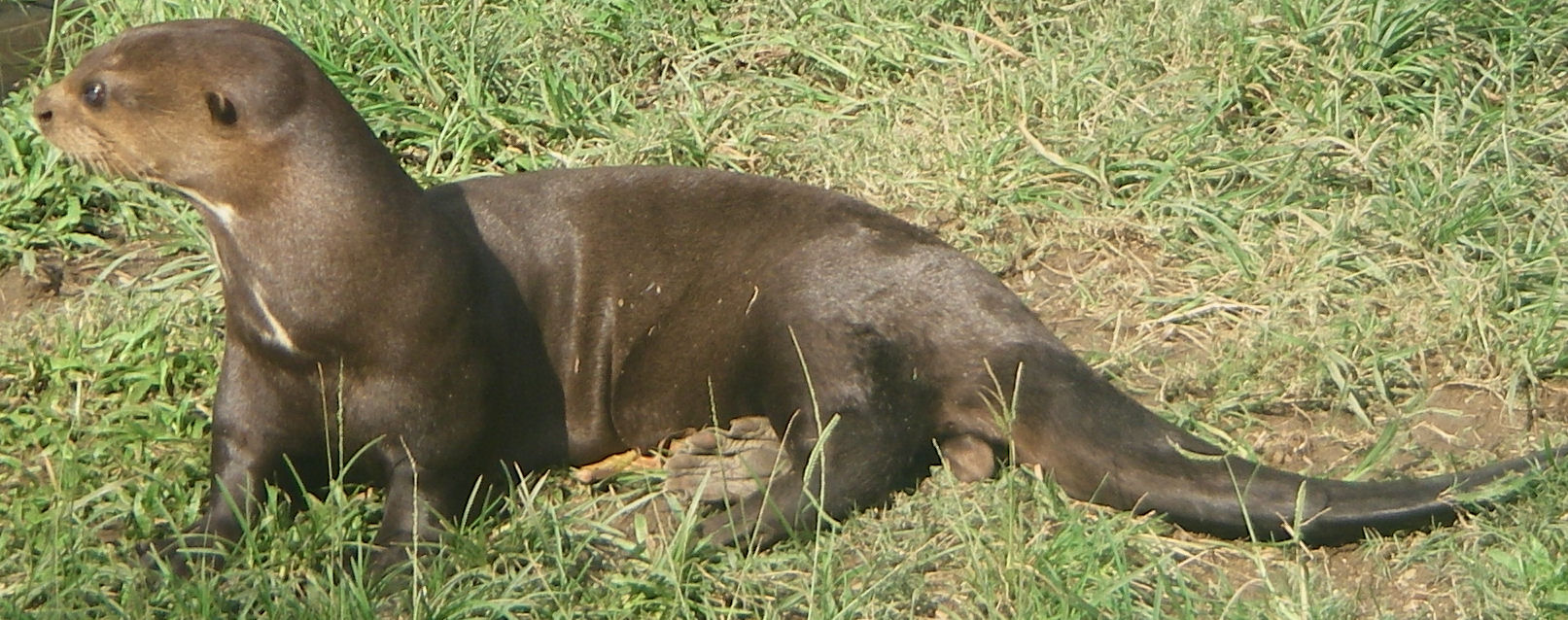
Giant otter

There are over 260 species of carnivorans, the majority of which feed primarily on meat. They have a characteristic skull shape and dentition.

- Suborder: Feliformia
  - Family: Felidae (cats)
    - Subfamily: Felinae
      - Genus: Herpailurus
        - Jaguarundi, H. yagouaroundi LC
      - Genus: Leopardus
        - Ocelot L. pardalis LC
        - Oncilla L. tigrinus VU
        - Margay L. wiedii NT
      - Genus: Puma
        - Cougar, P. concolor LC
    - Subfamily: Pantherinae
      - Genus: Panthera
        - Jaguar, P. onca NT
- Suborder: Caniformia
  - Family: Canidae (dogs, foxes)
    - Genus: Cerdocyon
      - Crab-eating fox, Cerdocyon thous LC
    - Genus: Speothos
      - Bush dog, Speothos venaticus VU
    - Genus: Urocyon
      - Gray fox, Urocyon cinereoargenteus LC
  - Family: Ursidae (bears)
    - Genus: Tremarctos
      - Spectacled bear, Tremarctos ornatus VU
  - Family: Procyonidae (raccoons)
    - Genus: Bassaricyon
      - Eastern lowland olingo, Bassaricyon alleni
    - Genus: Nasua
      - South American coati, Nasua nasua
    - Genus: Nasuella
      - Mountain coati, Nasuella olivacea DD
    - Genus: Potos
      - Kinkajou, Potos flavus
    - Genus: Procyon
      - Crab-eating raccoon, Procyon cancrivorus
  - Family: Mustelidae (mustelids)
    - Genus: Eira
      - Tayra, Eira barbara
    - Genus: Galictis
      - Greater grison, Galictis vittata
    - Genus: Lontra
      - Neotropical river otter, Lontra longicaudis NT
    - Genus: Neogale
      - Long-tailed weasel, Neogale frenata
    - Genus: Pteronura
      - Giant otter, Pteronura brasiliensis EN
  - Family: Mephitidae
    - Genus: Conepatus
      - Striped hog-nosed skunk, Conepatus semistriatus
- Suborder: Pinnipedia
  - Family: Phocidae (earless seals)
    - Genus: Neomonachus
      - Caribbean monk seal, Neomonachus tropicalis EX

==== Order: Perissodactyla (odd-toed ungulates) ====
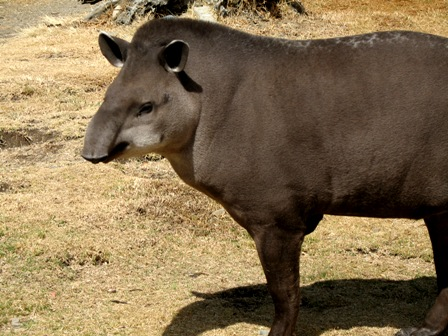
Brazilian tapir

The odd-toed ungulates are browsing and grazing mammals. They are usually large to very large, and have relatively simple stomachs and a large middle toe.

- Family: Tapiridae (tapirs)
  - Genus: Tapirus
    - Mountain tapir, T. pinchaque EN extirpated
    - Brazilian tapir, T. terrestris VU

==== Order: Artiodactyla (even-toed ungulates) ====
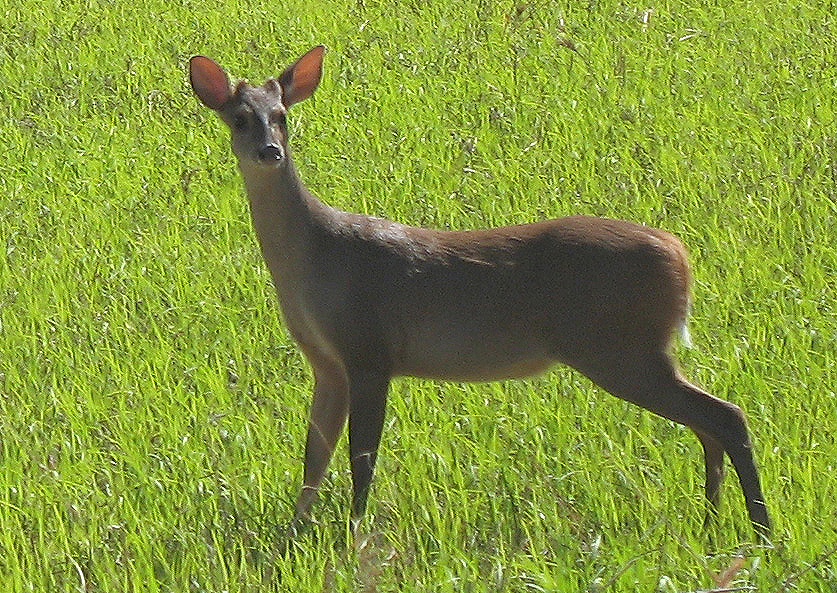
Red brocket

The even-toed ungulates are ungulates whose weight is borne about equally by the third and fourth toes, rather than mostly or entirely by the third as in perissodactyls. There are about 220 artiodactyl species, including many that are of great economic importance to humans.

- Family: Cervidae (deer)
  - Subfamily: Capreolinae
    - Genus: Mazama
      - Red brocket, Mazama americana DD
      - Gray brocket, Mazama gouazoupira DD
      - Little red brocket, Mazama rufina LR/nt
    - Genus: Odocoileus
      - White-tailed deer, Odocoileus virginianus LR/lc
- Family: Tayassuidae (peccaries)
  - Genus: Dicotyles
    - Collared peccary, D. tajacu LC
  - Genus: Tayassu
    - White-lipped peccary, Tayassu pecari NT

== See also ==
- List of chordate orders
- Lists of mammals by region
- List of prehistoric mammals
- Mammal classification
- List of mammals described in the 2000s

Other lists of fauna of Venezuela

- List of echinoderms of Venezuela
- List of Poriferans of Venezuela
- List of introduced molluscs of Venezuela
- List of marine molluscs of Venezuela
- List of molluscs of Falcón state, Venezuela
- List of non-marine molluscs of El Hatillo Municipality, Miranda, Venezuela
- List of non-marine molluscs of Venezuela
- List of birds of Venezuela
