= Long-tailed climbing mouse =

Long-tailed climbing mouse may refer to:

- Atlantic Forest climbing mouse (Rhipidomys mastacalis), an arboreal rodent species found in the Atlantic Forest of southeastern Brazil
- Cerrado climbing mouse (Rhipidomys macrurus), an arboreal rodent found in central and eastern Brazil
- Vandeleuria, a genus of rodent from Asia with only three species
