= Southern climbing mouse =

Conservation status
- Least Concern (IUCN 3.1)

Scientific classification
- Kingdom: Animalia
- Phylum: Chordata
- Class: Mammalia
- Order: Rodentia
- Family: Cricetidae
- Subfamily: Sigmodontinae
- Genus: Rhipidomys
- Species: R. austrinus

Binomial name
- Rhipidomys austrinus Thomas, 1921

Species of rodent

The southern climbing mouse (Rhipidomys austrinus) is a species of rodent in the family Cricetidae. It is found in Argentina and Bolivia in forested valleys and on slopes on the eastern side of the Andes Mountains.

== Description ==
The southern climbing mouse grows to a head-and-body length of about 170 mm (7 in), with a tail some 110 to 135% longer than this. There is a clear demarcation line between the dorsal and ventral pelage; the dorsal fur is dense and varies in colour from greyish brown to orangish brown, while the hairs of the ventral region have dark grey bases and creamy tips. The ears are large and oval in shape and the molars are large. The hind-feet are fairly large with clearly-outlined dark patches on their upper surfaces extending to the bases of the digits. The tail is brown with short hairs along its length and a terminal tuft of hairs.

== Distribution and habitat ==
The southern climbing mouse is found on the eastern slopes of the Andes in South America. Its range extends from Jujuy Province in northwestern Argentina northwards to Santa Cruz Department in central Bolivia and La Paz Department in northwestern Bolivia. Its altitudinal range is between about 350 and 2,600 m (1,100 and 8,500 ft), occurring at lower altitudes in Argentina and higher ones in La Paz, where it shares some of the valley systems with Gardner's climbing mouse (Rhipidomys gardneri) but generally occurs at higher elevations than that species. Its typical habitat is the Yungas forest that occurs in the densely wooded valleys, but in Argentina it also occurs in montane, transitional and lowland forests. It is nocturnal and a good tree climber, and is sometimes considered a pest in coffee plantations.

== Status ==
The southern climbing mouse is a common species with a wide distribution which seems to have a stable population and has adapted to many habitats, so the International Union for Conservation of Nature has rated its conservation status as being of "least concern".
