= Yellow-bellied climbing mouse =

Conservation status
- Data Deficient (IUCN 3.1)

Scientific classification
- Kingdom: Animalia
- Phylum: Chordata
- Class: Mammalia
- Order: Rodentia
- Family: Cricetidae
- Subfamily: Sigmodontinae
- Genus: Rhipidomys
- Species: R. ochrogaster

Binomial name
- Rhipidomys ochrogaster J.A. Allen, 1901

Species of rodent

The yellow-bellied climbing mouse (Rhipidomys ochrogaster) is a species of arboreal rodent in the family Cricetidae. It is known only from southeastern Peru, where it has been found in cloud forest at an elevation of 1830 m. This species was long known only by the type collection until it was rediscovered in May 2010.
