= Ybyra climbing rat =

Scientific classification
- Kingdom: Animalia
- Phylum: Chordata
- Class: Mammalia
- Order: Rodentia
- Family: Cricetidae
- Subfamily: Sigmodontinae
- Genus: Rhipidomys
- Species: R. ybyrae

Binomial name
- Rhipidomys ybyrae Lanes & Bonvincino, 2023

Species of rodent

The Ybyra climbing rat (Rhipidomys ybyrae) is a newly described species of rodent in the family Cricetidae. It is found in Brazil.

== See also ==
- List of living mammal species described in the 2020s
