= Coues's climbing mouse =

Conservation status
- Least Concern (IUCN 3.1)

Scientific classification
- Kingdom: Animalia
- Phylum: Chordata
- Class: Mammalia
- Order: Rodentia
- Family: Cricetidae
- Subfamily: Sigmodontinae
- Genus: Rhipidomys
- Species: R. couesi

Binomial name
- Rhipidomys couesi (J. A. Allen & Chapman, 1893)

Species of rodent

Coues's climbing mouse (Rhipidomys couesi) is a species of rodent in the family Cricetidae. It is found in Colombia, Ecuador, Peru, Trinidad and Tobago, and Venezuela. It is named in honour of the American zoologist Elliott Coues who studied birds and small mammals.

== Description ==
This is a large climbing mouse growing to a head-and-body length of up to 210 mm (8.3 in). The fur is rather coarse and short. The upper parts vary in colour from yellowish brown to reddish brown, the individual hairs being banded, and having black or dark brown guard hairs mixed among them. The underparts are creamy-white or yellowish, the hairs sometimes having grey bases. The tail is the same length as the head-and-body or a little longer, with dark scales, reddish-brown or dark brown hairs and a long terminal tuft of hair.

== Distribution and habitat ==
Coues's climbing mouse is a native of northern South America. It occurs in an arc from Trinidad and the island of Margarita, through the coastal region of northern Venezuela, and a swathe of west-central Venezuela (the southeasterly side of the Merida Andes and the foothills of the Eastern Cordillera) to Meta Department in central Colombia. This mouse is probably also present in the belt of humid forest connecting some of these areas. Further south than this, this mouse is replaced by the white-footed climbing mouse (Rhipidomys leucodactylus). Its altitudinal range is from sea level up to about 1,500 m (5,000 ft). It is an arboreal, nocturnal species and its typical habitats are primary and secondary rainforest, lowland forest and the lower regions of montane forest.
