= Greater long-tailed bat =

Conservation status
- Vulnerable (IUCN 3.1)

Scientific classification
- Kingdom: Animalia
- Phylum: Chordata
- Class: Mammalia
- Order: Chiroptera
- Family: Phyllostomidae
- Genus: Choeroniscus
- Species: C. periosus

Binomial name
- Choeroniscus periosus Handley, 1966
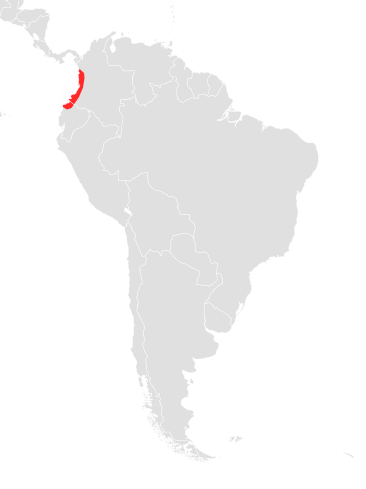
- Greater long-tailed bat range

Species of bat

The greater long-tailed bat (Choeroniscus periosus) is a species of bat in the family Phyllostomidae. It is found in Colombia and Ecuador.
