= Eastern Amazon climbing mouse =

Conservation status
- Least Concern (IUCN 3.1)

Scientific classification
- Kingdom: Animalia
- Phylum: Chordata
- Class: Mammalia
- Order: Rodentia
- Family: Cricetidae
- Subfamily: Sigmodontinae
- Genus: Rhipidomys
- Species: R. emiliae

Binomial name
- Rhipidomys emiliae (J.A. Allen, 1916)

Species of rodent

The eastern Amazon climbing mouse (Rhipidomys emiliae) is a rodent species from South America. It is endemic to central Brazil, where it is found in the eastern fringe of the Amazon rainforest, as well as in gallery forest and tropical dry forest within the cerrado ecoregion. It is often found in areas under cultivation.
