= Rhipidomys ipukensis =

Conservation status
- Data Deficient (IUCN 3.1)

Scientific classification
- Kingdom: Animalia
- Phylum: Chordata
- Class: Mammalia
- Order: Rodentia
- Family: Cricetidae
- Subfamily: Sigmodontinae
- Genus: Rhipidomys
- Species: R. ipukensis

Binomial name
- Rhipidomys ipukensis Rocha, Costa & Costa, 2011

Species of rodent

Rhipidomys ipukensis, also known as the Ipuca climbing rat, is a species of rodent in the family Cricetidae. It is endemic to the state Tocantins of Brazil.
