= Peruvian climbing mouse =

Conservation status
- Least Concern (IUCN 3.1)

Scientific classification
- Kingdom: Animalia
- Phylum: Chordata
- Class: Mammalia
- Order: Rodentia
- Family: Cricetidae
- Subfamily: Sigmodontinae
- Genus: Rhipidomys
- Species: R. modicus

Binomial name
- Rhipidomys modicus Thomas, 1926

Species of rodent

The Peruvian climbing mouse or lesser Peruvian rhipidomys (Rhipidomys modicus), is a South American species of rodent in the family Cricetidae. It is endemic to the eastern slopes of the Andes in central Peru, where it is found at altitudes from 700 to 1,800 metres (2,300 to 5,900 ft). The species is nocturnal and arboreal, and lives in lower montane forest and cloud forest. It is threatened by forest clearance for agriculture and coca cultivation but is listed as a "least-concern species" by the International Union for Conservation of Nature.

== Description ==
This mouse attains a head-and-body length of between 130 and 165 mm (5.1 and 6.5 in), with a relatively long tail some 135% of the head-and-body length. The fur is coarse and rather short. The general colour is yellowish- to reddish-brown agouti (with banded hairs) which contrasts with dark guard hairs. The underparts are whitish, the hairs having pale to dark grey bases, and there is sometimes an orange patch in the centre of the breast. The tail is mid to dark brown, sparsely covered with hair, and terminates in a moderately-long tuft of hair. The hindfeet are broad and their upper surfaces bear large dark patches that sometimes extend onto the digits.

== Status ==
This species is generally uncommon and is poorly known. Its primary habitat is virgin forest and it is not known whether it can adapt to secondary forest, although one individual was discovered in an old shed. The population trend is probably downward as the forest within its distributional range is being cleared for agricultural use and the production of illegal crops (coca), but its distribution is wide and the International Union for Conservation of Nature has rated its conservation status as being of "least concern". There are a number of protected areas within its general range but it is not known whether it is present in any of these.
