= Rhipidomys itoan =

Conservation status
- Least Concern (IUCN 3.1)

Scientific classification
- Kingdom: Animalia
- Phylum: Chordata
- Class: Mammalia
- Order: Rodentia
- Family: Cricetidae
- Subfamily: Sigmodontinae
- Genus: Rhipidomys
- Species: R. itoan

Binomial name
- Rhipidomys itoan de Andrade Costa, Geise, Pereira & Costa, 2011

Species of rodent

Rhipidomys itoan, also known as the sky climbing rat, is a species of rodent in the family Cricetidae.It is endemic to the Atlantic Forest of Brazil.
