= Broad-footed climbing mouse =

Conservation status
- Least Concern (IUCN 3.1)

Scientific classification
- Kingdom: Animalia
- Phylum: Chordata
- Class: Mammalia
- Order: Rodentia
- Family: Cricetidae
- Subfamily: Sigmodontinae
- Genus: Rhipidomys
- Species: R. latimanus

Binomial name
- Rhipidomys latimanus (Tomes, 1860)

Synonyms
- R. scandens Goldman, 1913

Species of rodent

The broad-footed climbing mouse (Rhipidomys latimanus) is a species of rodent in the family Cricetidae. It is found in Colombia, Ecuador, Panama and Peru.
