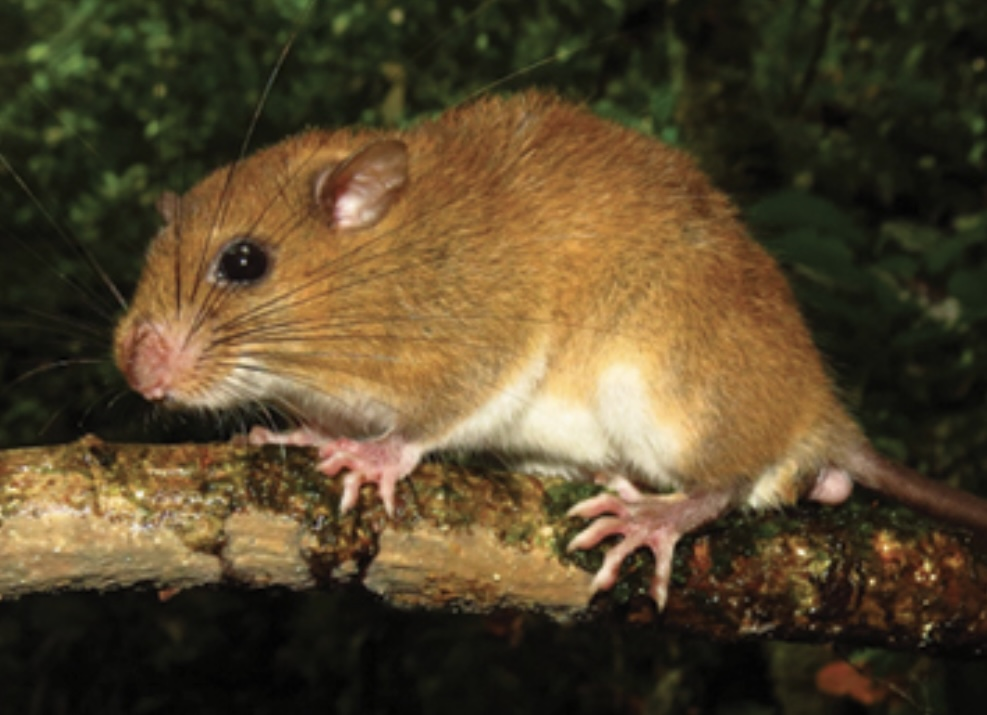

Conservation status
- Data Deficient (IUCN 3.1)

Scientific classification
- Kingdom: Animalia
- Phylum: Chordata
- Class: Mammalia
- Order: Rodentia
- Family: Cricetidae
- Subfamily: Sigmodontinae
- Genus: Rhipidomys
- Species: R. caucensis

Binomial name
- Rhipidomys caucensis J. A. Allen, 1913

= Cauca climbing mouse =

Species of rodent

The Cauca climbing mouse (Rhipidomys caucensis) is a species of arboreal rodent in the family Cricetidae. It is endemic to Colombia, where it is found in montane forest at elevations from 2200 to 3500 m.
