= Cariri climbing mouse =

Conservation status
- Data Deficient (IUCN 3.1)

Scientific classification
- Kingdom: Animalia
- Phylum: Chordata
- Class: Mammalia
- Order: Rodentia
- Family: Cricetidae
- Subfamily: Sigmodontinae
- Genus: Rhipidomys
- Species: R. cariri

Binomial name
- Rhipidomys cariri Tribe, 2005

Species of rodent

The Cariri climbing mouse (Rhipidomys cariri) is a partly arboreal rodent species from South America. It is known from two mesic localities in Ceará, northeastern Brazil, within the semiarid caatinga ecoregion. It has been found in areas under cultivation. Cariri is the name of an administrative microregion within the state of Ceará.
