= Rhipidomys tribei =

Conservation status
- Data Deficient (IUCN 3.1)

Scientific classification
- Kingdom: Animalia
- Phylum: Chordata
- Class: Mammalia
- Order: Rodentia
- Family: Cricetidae
- Subfamily: Sigmodontinae
- Genus: Rhipidomys
- Species: R. tribei

Binomial name
- Rhipidomys tribei Rocha, Costa & Costa, 2011

Species of rodent

Rhipidomys tribei, also known as the Tribe's climbing rat, is a species of rodent in the family Cricetidae. It is endemic to the state Minas Gerais of Brazil.
