= Splendid climbing mouse =

Conservation status
- Least Concern (IUCN 3.1)

Scientific classification
- Kingdom: Animalia
- Phylum: Chordata
- Class: Mammalia
- Order: Rodentia
- Family: Cricetidae
- Subfamily: Sigmodontinae
- Genus: Rhipidomys
- Species: R. nitela

Binomial name
- Rhipidomys nitela Thomas, 1901

Species of rodent

The splendid climbing mouse (Rhipidomys nitela) is a rodent species from South America. It is found in Brazil, French Guiana, Guyana, Suriname and Venezuela.
