= Buff-bellied climbing mouse =

Conservation status
- Least Concern (IUCN 3.1)

Scientific classification
- Kingdom: Animalia
- Phylum: Chordata
- Class: Mammalia
- Order: Rodentia
- Family: Cricetidae
- Subfamily: Sigmodontinae
- Genus: Rhipidomys
- Species: R. fulviventer

Binomial name
- Rhipidomys fulviventer Thomas, 1896

Species of rodent

The buff-bellied climbing mouse (Rhipidomys fulviventer) is a species of rodent in the family Cricetidae. It is found in Colombia and Venezuela.
