= Godman's long-tailed bat =

Conservation status
- Least Concern (IUCN 3.1)

Scientific classification
- Kingdom: Animalia
- Phylum: Chordata
- Class: Mammalia
- Order: Chiroptera
- Family: Phyllostomidae
- Genus: Choeroniscus
- Species: C. godmani

Binomial name
- Choeroniscus godmani Thomas, 1903
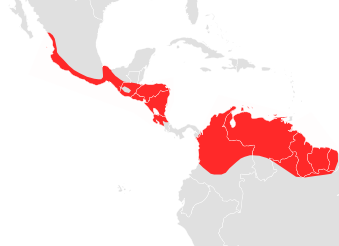
- Godman's long-tongued bat range

Species of bat

Godman's long-tailed bat (Choeroniscus godmani) is a species of bat in the family Phyllostomidae. It is found in Colombia, Costa Rica, El Salvador, Guatemala, Guyana, Honduras, Mexico, Nicaragua, Suriname, and Venezuela.
