= Gardner's climbing mouse =

Conservation status
- Least Concern (IUCN 3.1)

Scientific classification
- Kingdom: Animalia
- Phylum: Chordata
- Class: Mammalia
- Order: Rodentia
- Family: Cricetidae
- Subfamily: Sigmodontinae
- Genus: Rhipidomys
- Species: R. gardneri

Binomial name
- Rhipidomys gardneri Patton et al., 2000

Species of rodent

Gardner's climbing mouse (Rhipidomys gardneri) is a rodent species from South America. It is found in western Brazil, southeastern Peru and northeastern Bolivia. It is an uncommon, arboreal species, but faces no particular threats so the International Union for Conservation of Nature has rated it as being a "least-concern species".

== Description ==
Gardner's climbing mouse is one of the larger members of the genus, with a head-and-body length of 150 to 190 mm (5.9 to 7.5 in) and a tail rather longer than the body. The dorsal fur is short and rather coarse, varying in colour from grey to orange-brown, each hair being banded. The underparts are yellowish, the hairs on the throat and in the centre of the chest having grey bases. The tail is dark brown, clad in short hairs with a short tuft of hairs at the tip. The ears are rounded and of medium size. The dark patch on the upper surface of the large hind feet does not extend onto the toes.

== Distribution and habitat ==
Gardner's climbing mouse is native to southeastern Peru and Acre State, the most westerly state in Brazil, as well as the northeasterly part of Bolivia. It occurs in both primary and secondary forest, and its altitudinal range is between 200 and 2,500 m (700 and 8,200 ft) or more. It occurs in the drainages of the Rivers Juruá, Ucayeli, Madre de Dios and Beni.

== Status ==
Gardiner's climbing mouse has a wide range but is believed to be an uncommon species. Nevertheless, besides its forest home it has adapted to many disturbed and man-made habitats, including the thatched roofs of houses, and one female was found nursing young in the drawer of a piece of furniture. The International Union for Conservation of Nature has rated its conservation status as being of "least concern".
