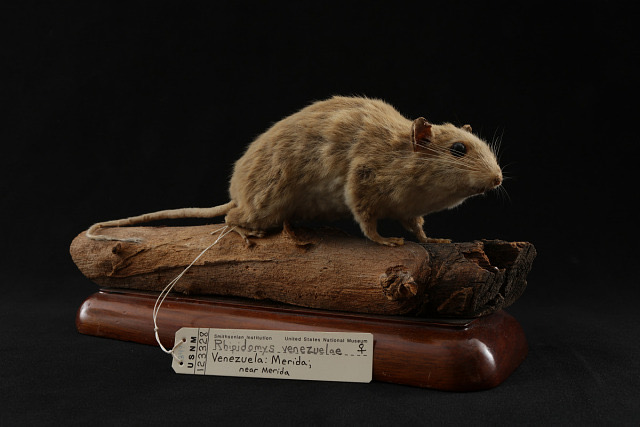

Conservation status
- Least Concern (IUCN 3.1)

Scientific classification
- Kingdom: Animalia
- Phylum: Chordata
- Class: Mammalia
- Order: Rodentia
- Family: Cricetidae
- Subfamily: Sigmodontinae
- Genus: Rhipidomys
- Species: R. venezuelae

Binomial name
- Rhipidomys venezuelae Thomas, 1896

= Venezuelan climbing mouse =

Species of rodent

The Venezuelan climbing mouse (Rhipidomys venezuelae) is a species of rodent in the family Cricetidae. It is found in Colombia, Tobago, and Venezuela.
