= Charming climbing mouse =

Conservation status
- Least Concern (IUCN 3.1)

Scientific classification
- Kingdom: Animalia
- Phylum: Chordata
- Class: Mammalia
- Order: Rodentia
- Family: Cricetidae
- Subfamily: Sigmodontinae
- Tribe: Thomasomyini
- Genus: Rhipidomys
- Species: R. venustus

Binomial name
- Rhipidomys venustus Thomas, 1900

Species of mammal

The charming climbing mouse (Rhipidomys venustus) is a species of nocturnal rodent in the family Cricetidae. It is endemic to Venezuela.

== Taxonomy ==
Rhipidomys venustus was first described by Oldfield Thomas in 1900. It is the only member of the genus Rhipidomys. The type specimen was found in "Las Vegas del Chama" in Merida; it was collected in 1896 by S. Briceño.

== Description ==
The charming climbing mouse is a medium-sized rodent weighing between 41 grams (1.4 oz) to 75 grams (2.6 oz). It has as head-body length between 121 millimetres (4.8 in) and 150 millimetres (5.9 in), with a tail between 123 millimetres (4.8 in) to 165 millimetres (6.5 in). It has large dark ears, between 18 millimetres (0.71 in) to 20 millimetres (0.79 in).

The thick, short fur is chestnut brown on the back and white with a dark slate base on the belly, with a sometimes reddish tail with a tuft of longer fur at the end.

== Habitat and conservation status ==
The charming climbing mouse is endemic to the mountains of western and northern Venezuela, in Merida, Trujillo, Tachira, Falcon, Yaracuy, Aragua, and Varagas states. It has been found at elevations from 1,200 metres (3,900 ft) to 2,280 metres (7,480 ft). Little is known about its population, diet, or lifecycle though one female has been observed to be pregnant in the local wet season (May to October). It is nocturnal and can be both tree and ground-dwelling. It is found in cloud and evergreen forests, as well as coffee plantations.

It is considered a species of Least Concern by the IUCN due to its wide distribution.
