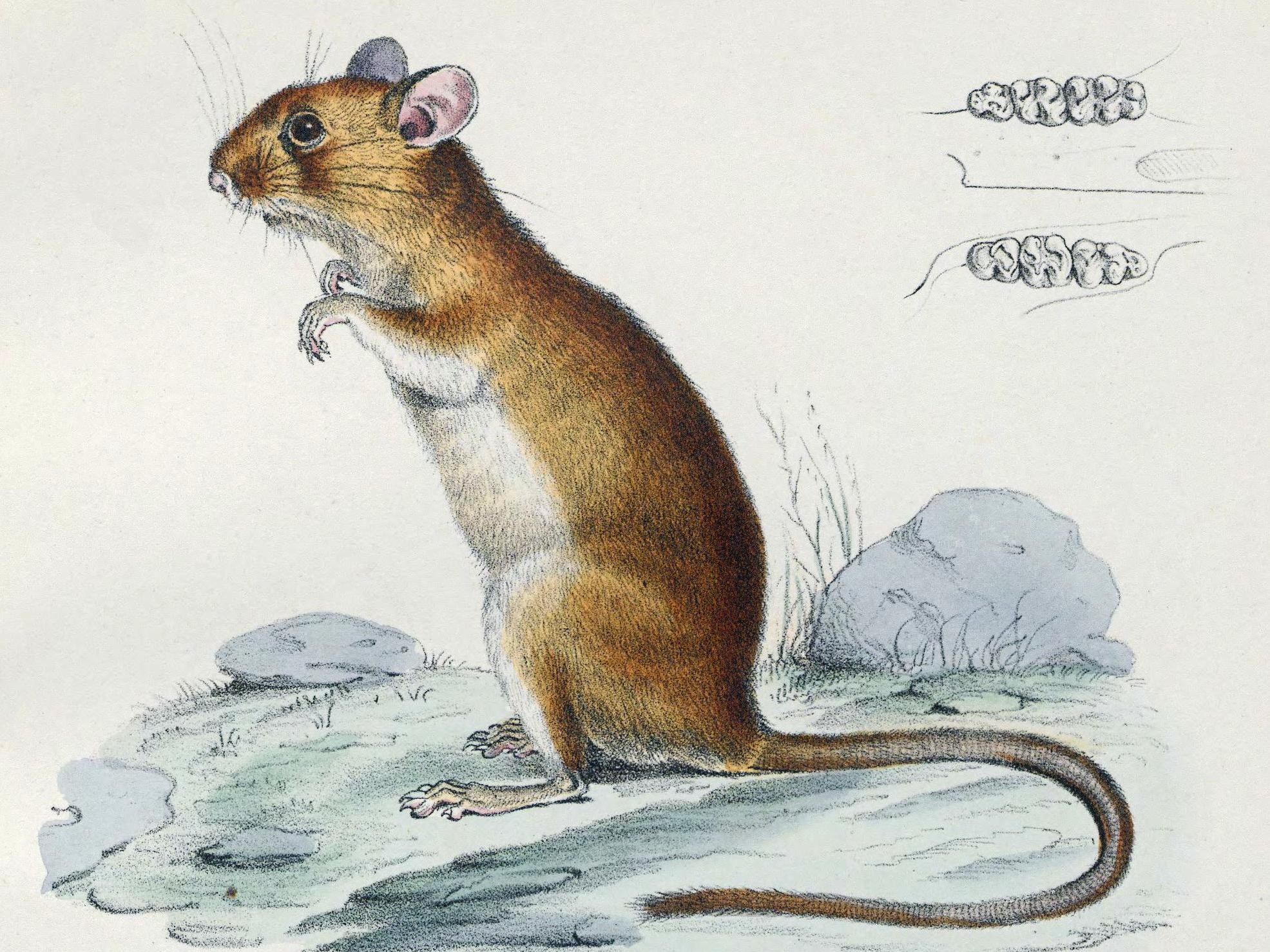

Conservation status
- Least Concern (IUCN 3.1)

Scientific classification
- Kingdom: Animalia
- Phylum: Chordata
- Class: Mammalia
- Order: Rodentia
- Family: Cricetidae
- Subfamily: Sigmodontinae
- Genus: Rhipidomys
- Species: R. macrurus

Binomial name
- Rhipidomys macrurus (Gervais, 1855)

= Cerrado climbing mouse =

Species of rodent

The cerrado climbing mouse or long-tailed rhipidomys (Rhipidomys macrurus) is an arboreal rodent species in the family Cricetidae from South America. It is found in primary or secondary forests of the cerrado and caatinga in central and eastern Brazil, and has also been seen in the Atlantic Forest. Its karyotype is 2n = 44, FN = 48-52. They are nocturnal animals and can be found in both tree canopies and on the ground.

This species should also not be confused with the cerrado mouse, Thalpomys cerradensis, the cerrado red-nosed mouse, Wiedomys cerradensis, or the cerrado grass mouse, Akodon serrensis. The Atlantic Forest climbing mouse (Rhipidomys mastacalis) has sometimes been similarly referred to as the "long-tailed climbing mouse". Rodents of genus Vandeleuria are also commonly known as long-tailed climbing mice.

== Morphology ==
Cerrado climbing mice are medium-sized mice with a head-and-body length of 125 to 145 mm (4.9 to 5.7 in) with dull reddish gray-brown dorsal pelage. The underparts are white or pale cream, typically with gray bases to the hairs. The tail is slightly longer than head-and-body length, has a tuft of long hairs at the tip and is medium to dark reddish brown. The medium brown ears are large. The hindfeet are robust and moderately long; there is a sometimes ill-defined dark patch in the centre of the upper surface and the surrounding area is golden brown.

== Ecology ==
This mouse is found throughout most of the cerrado in gallery forest and semi-deciduous woodland. It is nocturnal and mainly arboreal, but also descends to the ground on occasion. It has been known to enter houses. Cerrado climbing mice are seed eaters.
