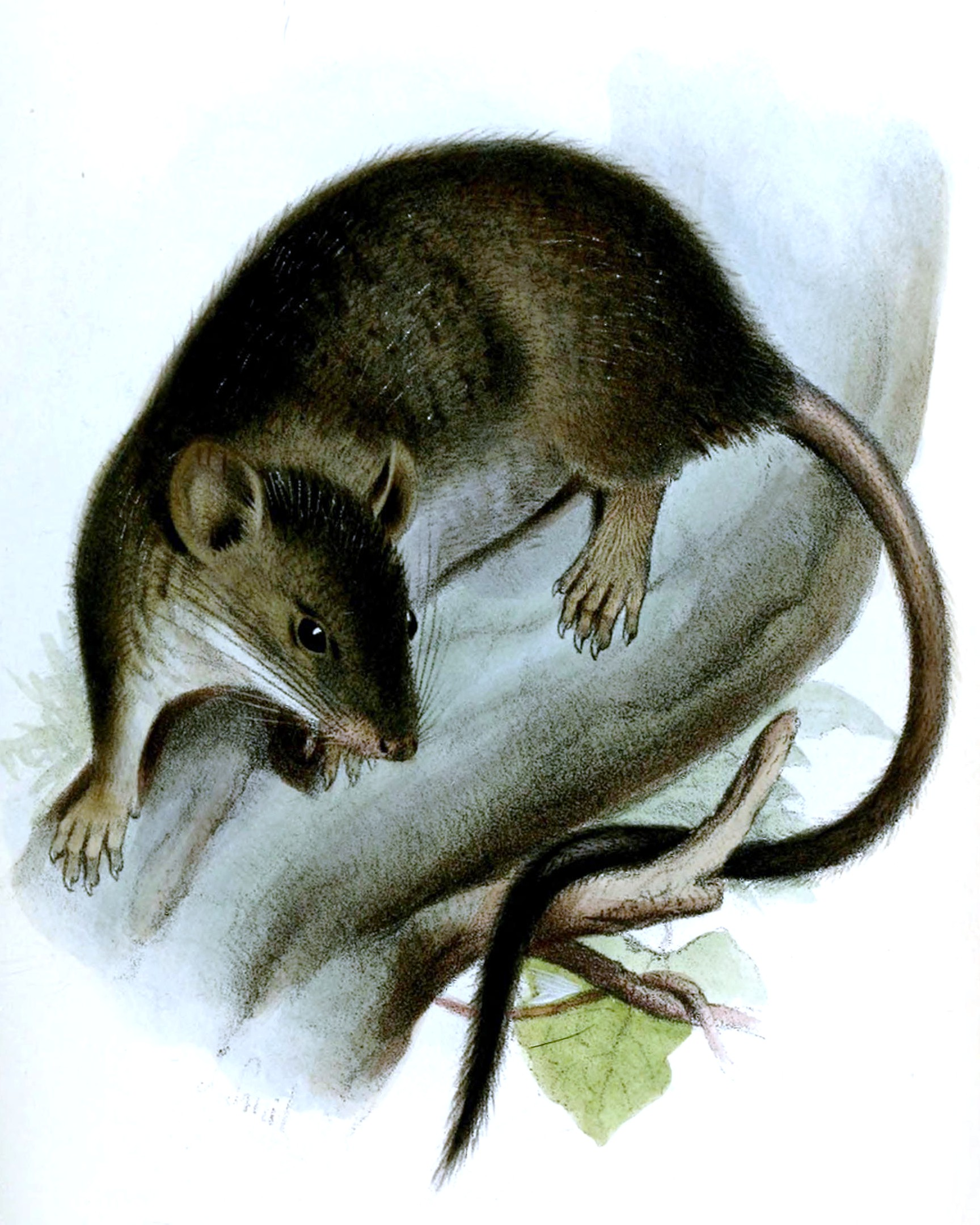

Conservation status
- Least Concern (IUCN 3.1)

Scientific classification
- Kingdom: Animalia
- Phylum: Chordata
- Class: Mammalia
- Order: Rodentia
- Family: Cricetidae
- Subfamily: Sigmodontinae
- Genus: Rhipidomys
- Species: R. leucodactylus

Binomial name
- Rhipidomys leucodactylus Tschudi, 1844

= White-footed climbing mouse =

Species of rodent

The white-footed climbing mouse (Rhipidomys leucodactylus) is a species of South American rodent found in Bolivia, Brazil, Ecuador, French Guiana, Guyana, Peru, Suriname and Venezuela. It is the type species of the genus and the type location was the lower eastern slopes of the Andes in central Peru.

== Description ==
With a head-and-body length of 180 mm (7 in), the white-footed climbing mouse is the largest species in the genus. The dorsal fur is typically medium brown, with the hairs being banded in yellowish and reddish hues, and long dark guard hairs being scattered throughout the coat. The flanks are rather paler and the underparts yellowish, cream or white, the hairs having grey bases. The tail is about the same length as the head-and-body and is densely clad in short reddish to dark brown fur and terminates with a long tuft of hair. The hind feet are large; the dorsal surface has a large dark patch which extends onto the first or second phalanges of digits II to V, and sometimes also onto digit I. The sides of the feet and around the toes are a silvery colour.

== Distribution and habitat ==
The white-footed climbing mouse is native to the rainforests of the Amazon Orinoco basin; it is present in the lowlands of west and central Brazil as well as the Andean piedmont area in eastern Bolivia and Venezuela. In Peru, its upper altitudinal limit is 1,750 m (5,700 ft). It is typically found in the canopy of trees growing in terra firme humid forest.

== Ecology ==
The white-footed climbing mouse normally lives in humid evergreen forests. It is a frugivore and has been found among crops, where it is considered a pest, and inside dwellings; it has been reported as gnawing a pineapple, eating sugarcane and yucca. Pregnant females with two or three embryos have been observed in Peru in August and September, and in Ecuador in September and November. One individual was nesting in a hole 15 m (50 ft) off the ground in a tree.

== Status ==
This is a generally uncommon species which has a very wide distribution. The population trend is unknown but the total population is assumed to be large and the International Union for Conservation of Nature has rated the animal's conservation status as being of "least concern".
