= Wetzel's climbing mouse =

Conservation status
- Least Concern (IUCN 3.1)

Scientific classification
- Kingdom: Animalia
- Phylum: Chordata
- Class: Mammalia
- Order: Rodentia
- Family: Cricetidae
- Subfamily: Sigmodontinae
- Genus: Rhipidomys
- Species: R. wetzeli

Binomial name
- Rhipidomys wetzeli Gardner, 1989

Species of rodent

Wetzel's climbing mouse (Rhipidomys wetzeli) is a species of rodent in the family Cricetidae. It is endemic to Venezuela.
