= Choeroniscus =

Scientific classification
- Domain: Eukaryota
- Kingdom: Animalia
- Phylum: Chordata
- Class: Mammalia
- Order: Chiroptera
- Family: Phyllostomidae
- Subfamily: Glossophaginae
- Genus: Choeroniscus; Thomas, 1928

Type species
- Choeronycteris minor Peters, 1868

Species
- C. godmani C. periosus C. minor

Genus of bats

Choeroniscus (long-tailed bat) is a genus of bat in the family Phyllostomidae.

It contains the following species:

- Godman's long-tailed bat (Choeroniscus godmani)
- Lesser long-tongued bat (Choeroniscus minor)
- Greater long-tailed bat (Choeroniscus periosus)
