= MacConnell's climbing mouse =

Conservation status
- Least Concern (IUCN 3.1)

Scientific classification
- Kingdom: Animalia
- Phylum: Chordata
- Class: Mammalia
- Order: Rodentia
- Family: Cricetidae
- Subfamily: Sigmodontinae
- Genus: Rhipidomys
- Species: R. macconnelli

Binomial name
- Rhipidomys macconnelli de Winton, 1900

Species of rodent

MacConnell's climbing mouse (Rhipidomys macconnelli) is a nocturnal and arboreal rodent species from South America. It is found in Brazil, Guyana and Venezuela, where it inhabits rainforest at elevations from 300 to 2800 m.
