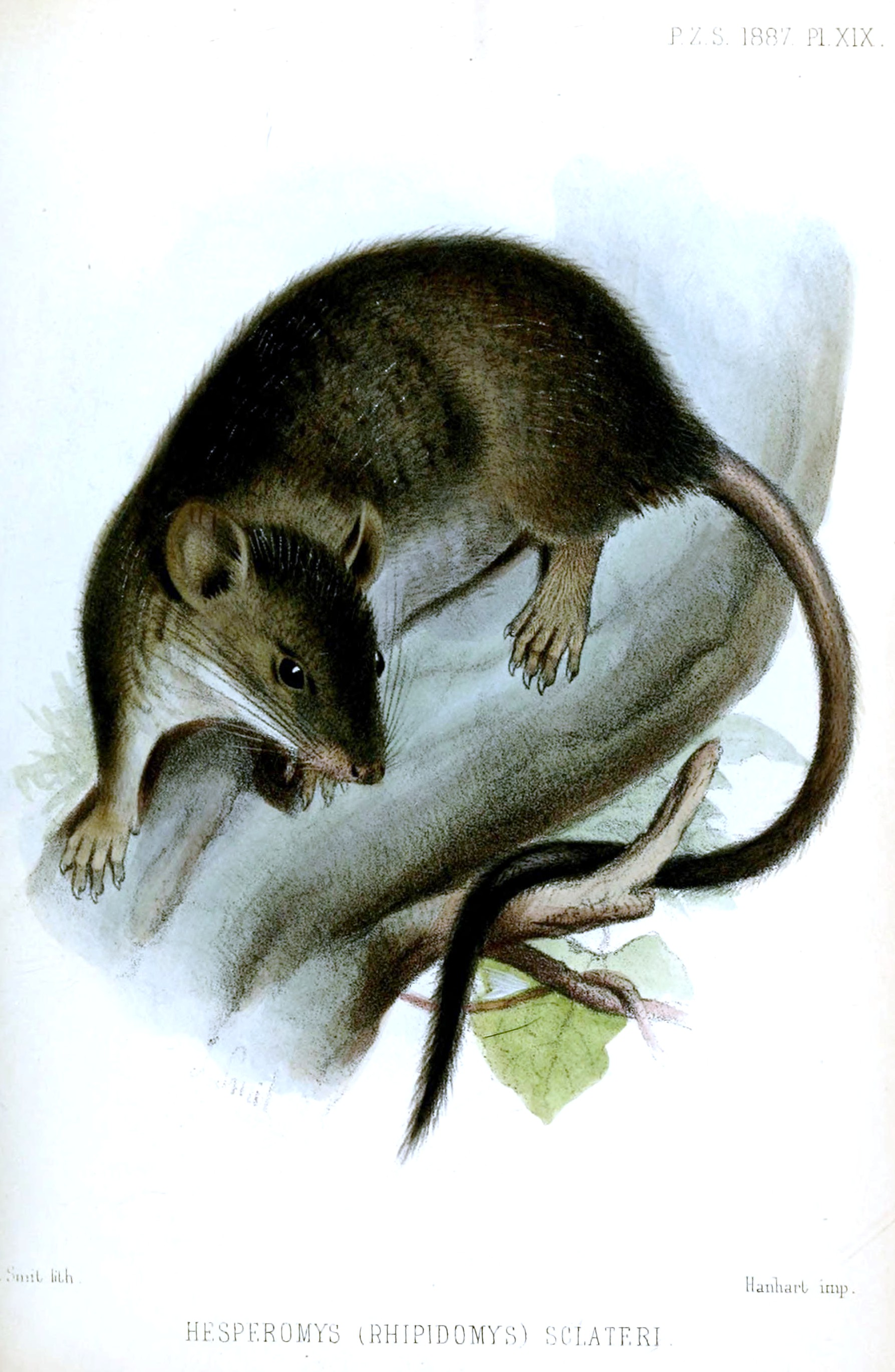
- White-footed climbing mouse (Rhipidomys leucodactylus)

Scientific classification
- Domain: Eukaryota
- Kingdom: Animalia
- Phylum: Chordata
- Class: Mammalia
- Order: Rodentia
- Family: Cricetidae
- Subfamily: Sigmodontinae
- Tribe: Thomasomyini
- Genus: Rhipidomys; Tschudi, 1845

Type species
- Hesperomys leucodactylus

Species
- Rhipidomys albujai Rhipidomys austrinus Rhipidomys cariri Rhipidomys caucensis Rhipidomys couesi Rhipidomys emiliae Rhipidomys fulviventer Rhipidomys gardneri Rhipidomys ipukensis Rhipidomys itoan Rhipidomys latimanus Rhipidomys leucodactylus Rhipidomys macconnelli Rhipidomys macrurus Rhipidomys mastacalis Rhipidomys modicus Rhipidomys nitela Rhipidomys ochrogaster Rhipidomys similis Rhipidomys tenuicauda Rhipidomys tribei Rhipidomys venezuelae Rhipidomys venustus Rhipidomys wetzeli Rhipidomys ybyrae

= Rhipidomys =

Rhipidomys Temporal range: Pleistocene to Recent

Genus of rodents

Rhipidomys is a genus of rodents in the family Cricetidae, The following 25 species of climbing mouse species are currently recognised:

- Rhipidomys albujai
- Southern climbing mouse (Rhipidomys austrinus)
- Cariri climbing mouse (Rhipidomys cariri)
- Cauca climbing mouse (Rhipidomys caucensis)
- Coues's climbing mouse (Rhipidomys couesi)
- Eastern Amazon climbing mouse (Rhipidomys emiliae)
- Buff-bellied climbing mouse (Rhipidomys fulviventer)
- Gardner's climbing mouse (Rhipidomys gardneri)
- Rhipidomys ipukensis
- Rhipidomys itoan
- Broad-footed climbing mouse (Rhipidomys latimanus)
- White-footed climbing mouse (Rhipidomys leucodactylus)
- MacConnell's climbing mouse (Rhipidomys macconnelli)
- Cerrado climbing mouse (Rhipidomys macrurus)
- Atlantic Forest climbing mouse (Rhipidomys mastacalis)
- Peruvian climbing mouse (Rhipidomys modicus)
- Splendid climbing mouse (Rhipidomys nitela)
- Yellow-bellied climbing mouse (Rhipidomys ochrogaster)
- Rhipidomys similis
- Rhipidomys tenuicauda
- Rhipidomys tribei
- Venezuelan climbing mouse (Rhipidomys venezuelae)
- Charming climbing mouse (Rhipidomys venustus)
- Wetzel's climbing mouse (Rhipidomys wetzeli)
- Ybyra climbing rat (Rhipidomys ybyrae)
