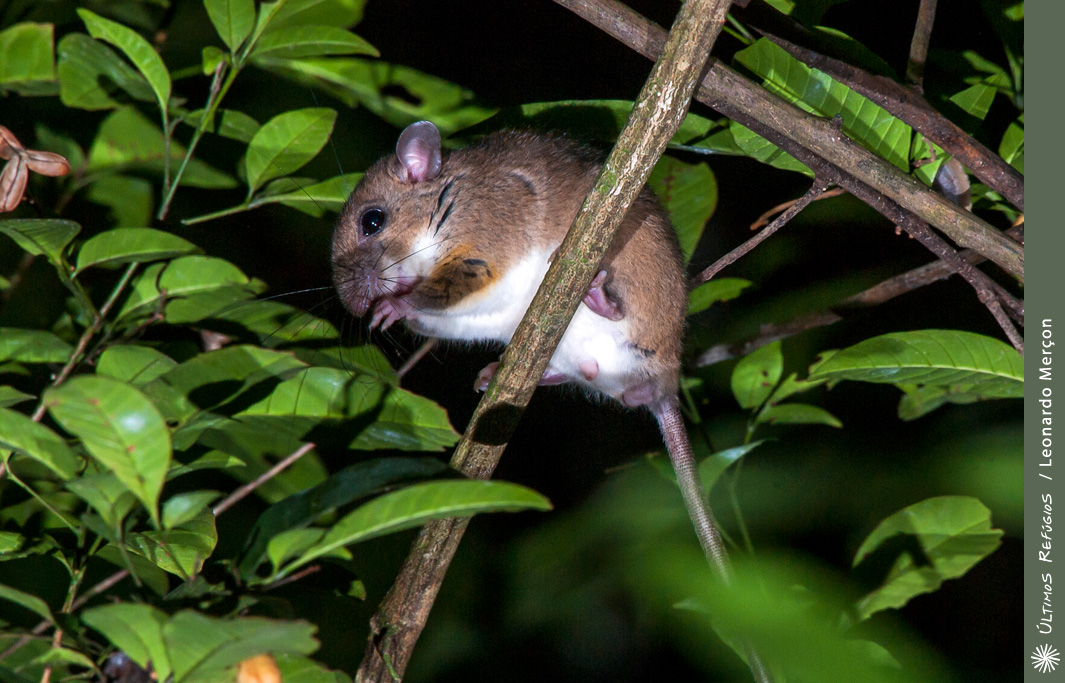

Conservation status
- Least Concern (IUCN 3.1)

Scientific classification
- Kingdom: Animalia
- Phylum: Chordata
- Class: Mammalia
- Order: Rodentia
- Family: Cricetidae
- Subfamily: Sigmodontinae
- Genus: Rhipidomys
- Species: R. mastacalis

Binomial name
- Rhipidomys mastacalis (Lund, 1841)

= Atlantic Forest climbing mouse =

Species of rodent

The Atlantic Forest climbing mouse (Rhipidomys mastacalis) is an arboreal rodent species in the family Cricetidae from South America. It is found in the Atlantic Forest of southeastern Brazil at elevations from sea level to 1500 m. It utilizes the ground more than the understory in isolated forests (highland marshes) however this utilization changes in certain areas of the Atlantic Forest where it prefers to use the vegetation canopy. Its karyotype is 2n = 44, FN = 74–80.

It is sometimes also referred to as the long-tailed climbing mouse. Rhipidomys macrurus is similarly sometimes commonly known as the "long-tailed rhipidomys", while rodents of genus Vandeleuria are also commonly known as long-tailed climbing mice.
