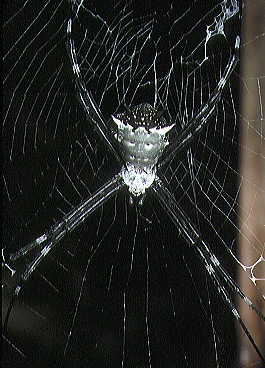
- Silvery form (female)

Scientific classification
- Kingdom: Animalia
- Phylum: Arthropoda
- Subphylum: Chelicerata
- Class: Arachnida
- Order: Araneae
- Infraorder: Araneomorphae
- Family: Araneidae
- Genus: Argiope
- Species: A. submaronica

Binomial name
- Argiope submaronica Strand, 1916

Synonyms
- Argiope savignyi Levi, 1968

= Argiope submaronica =

Species of spider

Argiope submaronica is a species of spider in the family Araneidae (orb-weavers), found from Mexico to Bolivia, and in Brazil. The name was at one time considered a synonym of Argiope argentata, but A. submaronica is now treated as a separate species. It has also been known under the synonym Argiope savignyi.

It was observed to capture and feed on the proboscis bat Rhynchonycteris naso in Costa Rica, totally encasing the bat in silk during the course of a day.

Through an observational study done at the La Selva Biological Station, they saw that the bats are usually caught on the spider’s web and then fully wrapped by the spider’s silk. Afterward, the spider was observed to be near or on the bat as the day went by and manipulation of its parts of the mouth on the bat signified active feeding. This was the first recorded phenomenon of an emballonurid bat being preyed on by an invertebrate, and the first documented proof of Argiope being able to catch and consume a mammal.

A. submaronica sometimes spins a silk disc, sometimes a cruciate pattern, and sometimes combines both types. These structures are thought to provide five purposes: protection from predators, advertising to vertebrates to avoid web damage, prey attraction, web stability, and a source of shade. Different designs had different purposes or functions.
