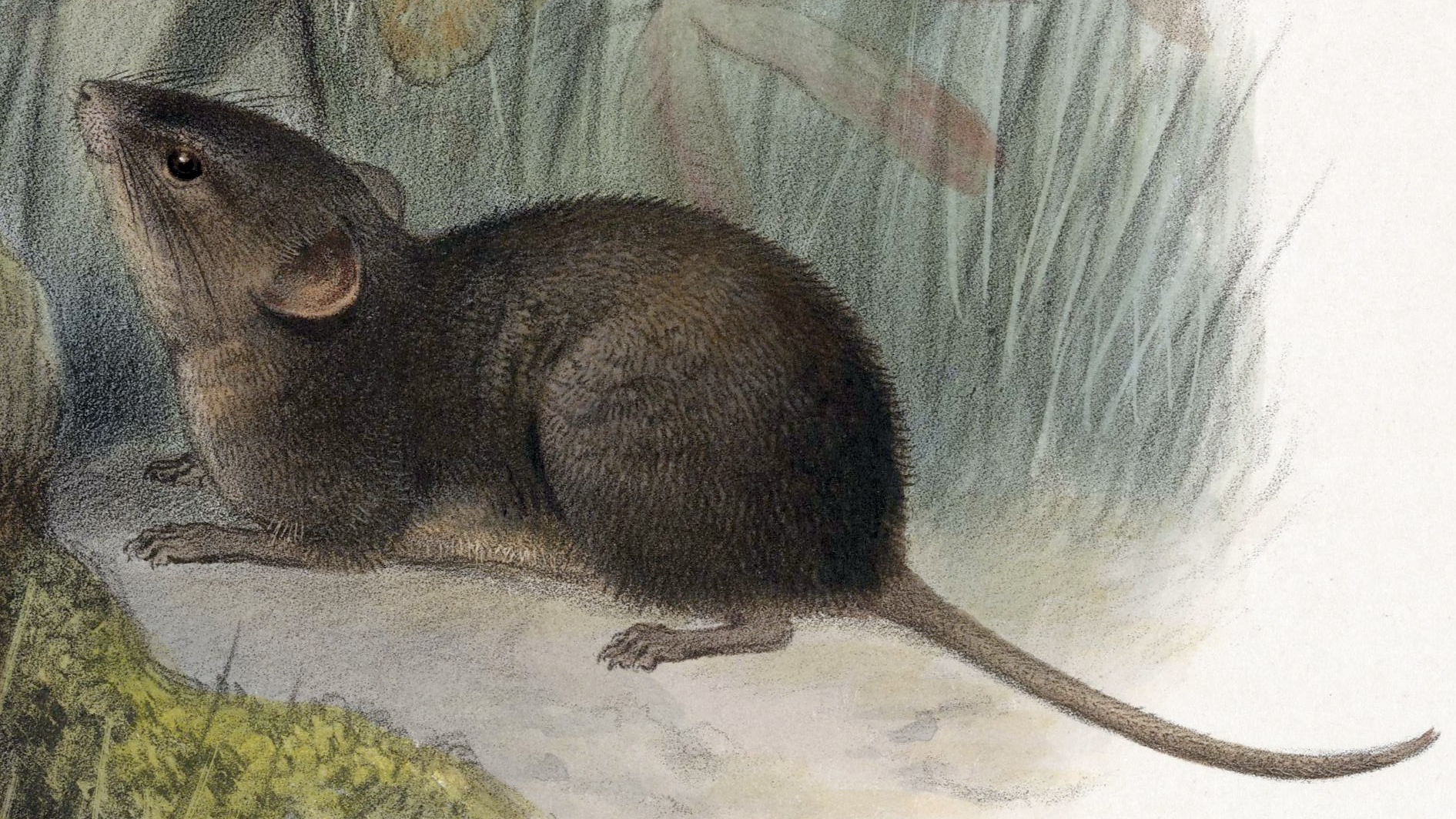
- Alston's brown mouse (S. teguina)

Scientific classification
- Kingdom: Animalia
- Phylum: Chordata
- Class: Mammalia
- Order: Rodentia
- Family: Cricetidae
- Subfamily: Neotominae
- Tribe: Baiomyini
- Genus: Scotinomys; Thomas, 1913

Type species
- Hesperomys teguina Alston, 1877

Species
- Scotinomys teguina Scotinomys xerampelinus

= Scotinomys =

Genus of rodents

Scotinomys is a genus of rodent, the singing mice, in the family Cricetidae. Together with Baiomys, it forms the tribe Baiomyini. It contains the following species:

- Alston's brown mouse (Scotinomys teguina)
- Chiriqui brown mouse (Scotinomys xerampelinus)

They are found in mountainous areas in Central America, at altitudes of 1000 m to at least 3500 m. As their common name indicates, they are notable for their acoustic communication. They are insectivorous. The two species show substantial divergence in behaviour and reproduction, with S. xerampelinus generally dominant over S. teguina where the species occur together.
