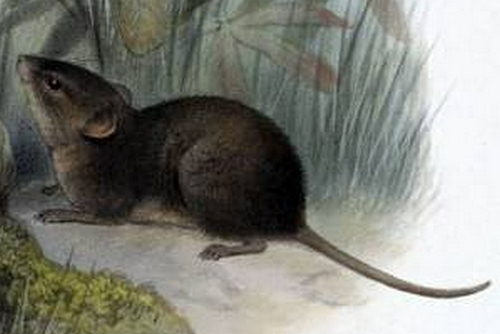

Conservation status
- Least Concern (IUCN 3.1)

Scientific classification
- Kingdom: Animalia
- Phylum: Chordata
- Class: Mammalia
- Infraclass: Placentalia
- Order: Rodentia
- Family: Cricetidae
- Subfamily: Neotominae
- Genus: Scotinomys
- Species: S. teguina

Binomial name
- Scotinomys teguina (Alston, 1877)

= Alston's brown mouse =

Species of mammal

Alston's brown mouse, also called Alston's singing mouse, short-tailed singing mouse, or singing mouse (Scotinomys teguina), is a species of rodent in the family Cricetidae. It is found in Central America, from Chiapas, Mexico, to western Panama.

This species produces vocalizations in both the sonic and ultrasonic range that are thought to be an important component of its communication behavior.

The mouse is named after Scottish zoologist Edward Richard Alston, who first described it in 1876.

== Distribution and habitat ==
S. teguina is exclusively found in the highland forests of southern North America and throughout Central America, from Chiapas, Mexico to western Panama, at elevations between 1100 and 2950 meters. Costa Rica, El Salvador, Guatemala, Honduras, Mexico, Nicaragua, and Panama. This rodent prefers wet habitats with subtropical climates, and is commonly observed in grassy clearings and rocky areas at the forest edge. S. teguina is diurnal in the wild. In laboratory settings, it is predominantly active in the morning, with decreasing activity in the afternoon to evening hours.

== Description ==
S. teguina is small (10–13 grams), with a dark coat, and a short tail. Its underparts are dark gray-brown to orange-brown. The tail is blackish and lightly haired and its feet are black. It also emits a noticeably strong, musky odor.

== Behavior ==
S. teguina is predominantly insectivorous, feeding on beetles and other small insects. Additionally, seeds and fruits make up a small portion of its diet.

Male Alston's singing mouse (Scotinomys teguina) singing to female in estrus

S. teguina is often recognized for its unique vocalization behavior. Both males and females produce vocalizations which are characterized by singing bouts containing both sonic and ultrasonic elements. Male songs tend to be longer than females, but seem to share similar spectral characteristics. The singing is created by whistling created with an inflated air sac called the ventral pouch. This enlarged air sac is not found in other Neotominae species. Although ultrasonic vocalizations have been demonstrated in numerous rodent species, few display vocalizing bouts as continuous and stereotyped as S. teguina. Because of their length and complexity, these vocalizations have been described as "song". When singing, the mouse rears on its hind legs and extends its neck, facing upward while producing a stereotypical call of up to 10 seconds. The song is loud, with components audible to humans typically occurring towards the end of the call. Research links their singing to an expansion of projections from their orofacial motor cortex to areas involved in vocalization in their auditory cortex and their periaqueductal grey.

The exact function of the singing behavior is not yet well understood, but it is believed to play an important role in social communication. For this reason, a growing interest has emerged in studying S. teguina in laboratory settings as a potential model for animal language in mammalian species. Stereotypical calls may provide an adaptive mechanism for the localization of conspecifics, and vocalizations in the ultrasonic range are typically inaudible to most predators. Different brain systems are responsible for the melody of the songs and the coordination of duets with another mouse. The functional role of FOXP2 expression in S. teguina and other vocalizing rodent species has been examined.

Male Alston's singing mice sing to attract mates and to warn off other males of their species from their territories. They react to songs of the related, larger, competing species, S. xerampelinus by silently retreating.

S. teguina uses olfactory cues to convey information about sex, reproductive status, and conspecifics. Much of this information in transmitted through secretions of the midventral sebaceous gland.
