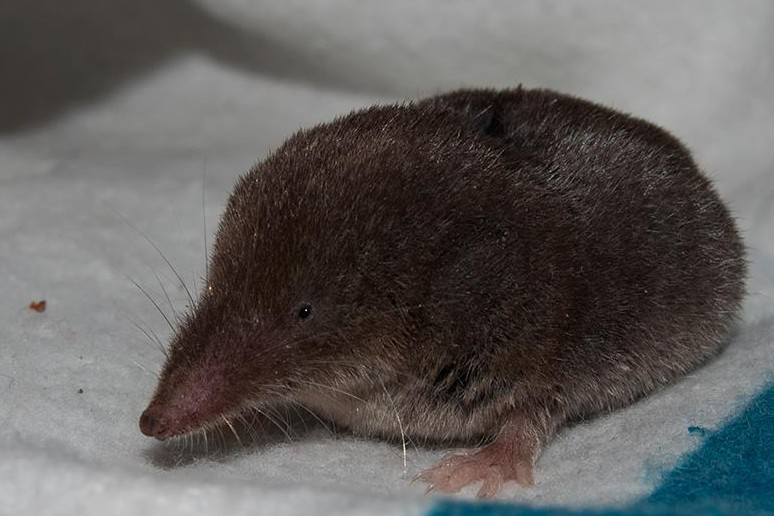

Conservation status
- Data Deficient (IUCN 3.1)

Scientific classification
- Kingdom: Animalia
- Phylum: Chordata
- Class: Mammalia
- Order: Eulipotyphla
- Family: Soricidae
- Genus: Cryptotis
- Species: C. orophila

Binomial name
- Cryptotis orophila (J.A. Allen, 1895)
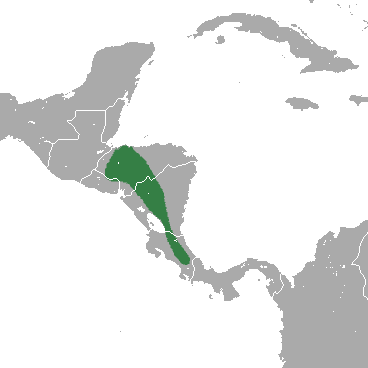
- Central American least shrew range

= Central American least shrew =

Species of mammal

The Central American least shrew (Cryptotis orophila) is a species of mammal in the family Soricidae. It is found in the highlands and mid-elevations from the western part of the northern coast of Honduras to central Costa Rica. It is found in El Salvador, Honduras, Nicaragua, and Costa Rica. It was considered to be a subspecies of the North American least shrew (C. parva) until 2002.
