= Edward Richard Alston =

Scottish zoologist

Edward Richard Alston FLS FZS (1 December 1845 – 7 March 1881) was a Scottish zoologist.

Alston was born at Stockbriggs, near Lesmahagow, on 1 December 1845. He was delicate in youth, so chiefly self-educated at home. He very early contributed to The Zoologist and various Scottish magazines, and ultimately became an acknowledged authority on mammalia and birds. His principal papers in the Proceedings of the Zoological Society (1874–80) are upon rodents, especially American squirrels (1878 and 1879). The division Mammalia in Salvin and Godman's Biologia Centrali-Americana was written by him, though its publication was incomplete at his death. In 1880, he was elected zoological secretary of the Linnean Society, which office he held till his death from acute phthisis on 7 March 1881. In 1874, he largely assisted Professor Thomas Bell in the second edition of British Quadrupeds.

Alston's singing mouse is named in his honor.
