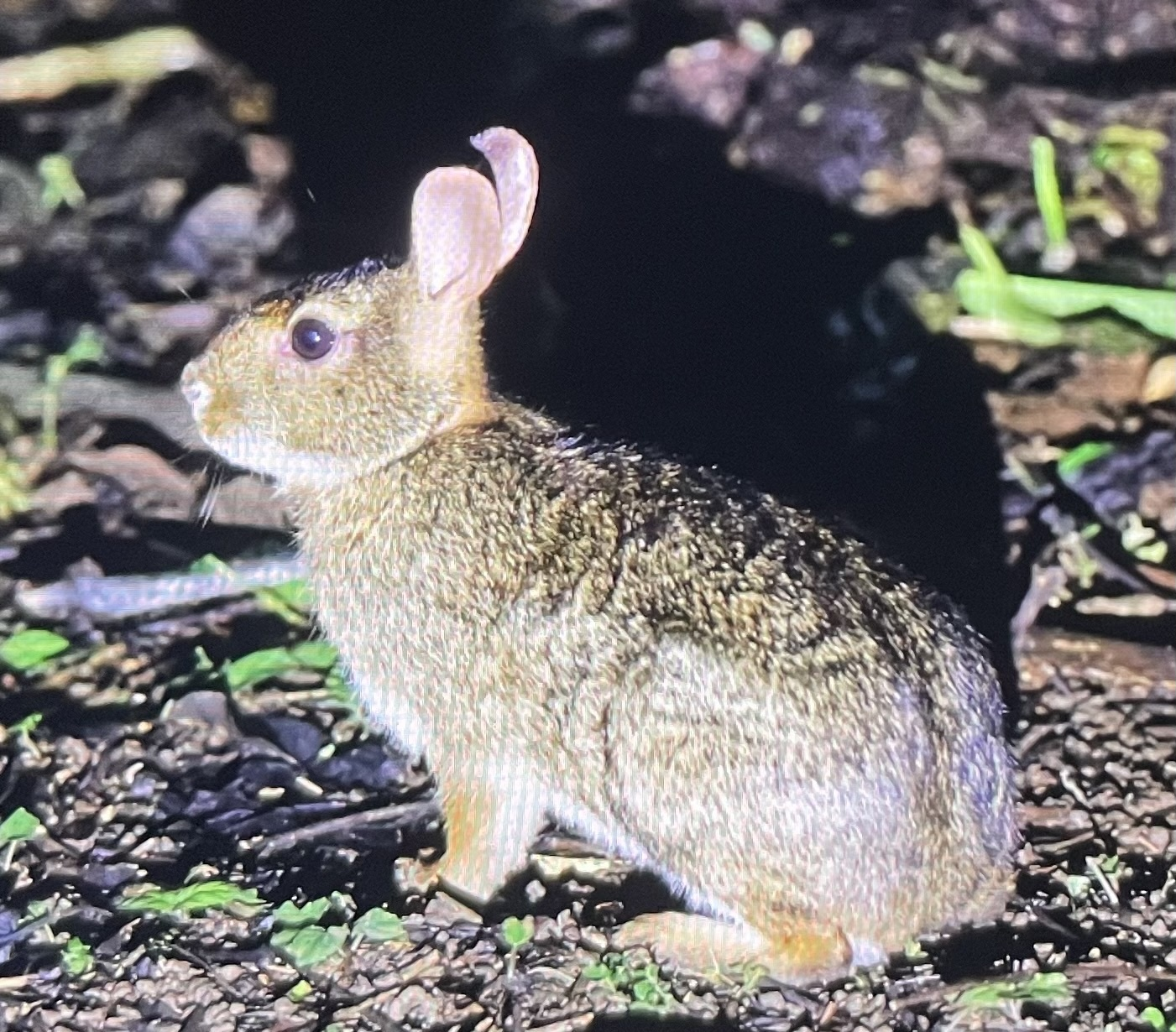
- Puerto Viejo, Sarapiquí, Costa Rica

Conservation status
- Least Concern (IUCN 3.1)

Scientific classification
- Kingdom: Animalia
- Phylum: Chordata
- Class: Mammalia
- Order: Lagomorpha
- Family: Leporidae
- Genus: Sylvilagus
- Species: S. gabbi

Binomial name
- Sylvilagus gabbi (J.A. Allen 1877)

Synonyms
- Sylvilagus brasiliensis gabbi J.A. Allen (1877)

= Central American tapeti =

Species of mammal

The Central American tapeti (Sylvilagus gabbi) or Gabb's cottontail is a species of cottontail rabbit native to southern Mexico and much of Central America. It was previously considered a subspecies of the common tapeti (Sylvilagus brasiliensis) but analysis in 2017 confirmed that it is sufficiently distinct in both appearance and genetics to be considered a species in its own right. It is closely related to the northern tapeti, which some authors describe as a subspecies of S. gabbi. The name Gabbi's cottontail comes from American paleontologist William More Gabb.

== Taxonomy ==
There are six subspecies of the Central American tapeti. The most widespread are S. g. gabbi, the nominate subspecies, which is widespread throughout eastern Costa Rica, eastern Nicaragua, Honduras, and eastern Panama, and S. g. truei, found in southern Belize, Guatemala, and southeastern Mexico. The rest of the Central American tapeti subspecies are less common:

- S. g. consobrinus, of unknown relation, but speculated to belong to S. g. gabbi or S. g. messorius
- S. g. messorius, found at altitudes up to 550 metres (1,800 ft), lives in the Darién Gap and possibly Colombia
- S. g. tumacus, similar to northern-range nominate subspecies
- S. g. incitatus, known only from Isla del Rey, Panama

== Range and distribution ==
The Central American Tapeti is distributed in Central America from eastern to southeastern Mexico to Panama. Thereby the range of the northern subspecies and nominate form Sylvilagus gabbi gabbi extends from Mexico (Tamaulipas, San Luis Potosí, Veracruz, Querétaro, Hidalgo, Puebla, Oaxaca, Chiapas, Tabasco and Campeche) to Guatemala and Belize while the subspecies Sylvilagus gabbi truei occurs from Guatemala via Honduras, Nicaragua and Costa Rica to Panama. The distribution of Sylvilagus gabbi truei is limited by the fact that the subspecies is not known to occur in Central America.
