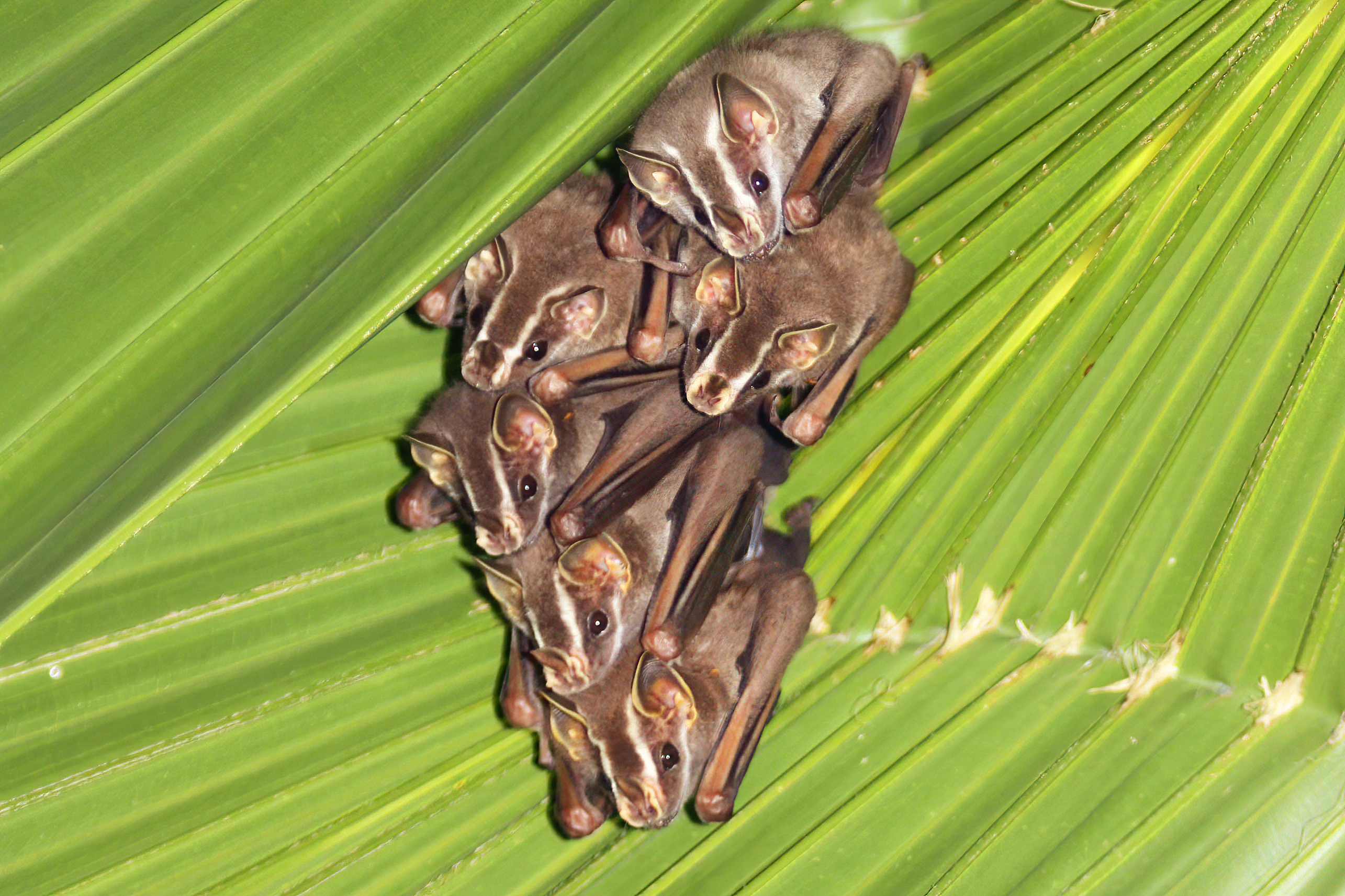
- Tent-making bat (Uroderma bilobatum)

Scientific classification
- Domain: Eukaryota
- Kingdom: Animalia
- Phylum: Chordata
- Class: Mammalia
- Order: Chiroptera
- Family: Phyllostomidae
- Subfamily: Stenodermatinae
- Genus: Uroderma; Peters, 1865

Type species
- Phyllostoma personatum Peters, 1865

= Uroderma =

Tent-making bats

Genus of bats

Uroderma is a genus of Central and South American phyllostomid bats.

== Species ==
Baker's tent-making bat, Uroderma bakeri
Tent-making bat, Uroderma bilobatum
Brown tent-making bat, Uroderma magnirostrum
