= Chiriqui brown mouse =

Conservation status
- Least Concern (IUCN 3.1)

Scientific classification
- Kingdom: Animalia
- Phylum: Chordata
- Class: Mammalia
- Order: Rodentia
- Family: Cricetidae
- Subfamily: Neotominae
- Genus: Scotinomys
- Species: S. xerampelinus

Binomial name
- Scotinomys xerampelinus (Bangs, 1902)

Species of rodent

The Chiriqui brown mouse (Scotinomys xerampelinus), also known as the long-tailed singing mouse, is a species of rodent in the family Cricetidae. It is found in cloud forest and paramo at elevations of 2100 to 3400 m in Costa Rica and Panama.

Male Chiriqui brown mice sing to attract mates and to warn off other males from their territories. Their songs also serve to repel members of the related, smaller, competing species, S. teguina. Additionally, the length and aggression of male Chiriqui brown mice's calls are modulated by androgen.
