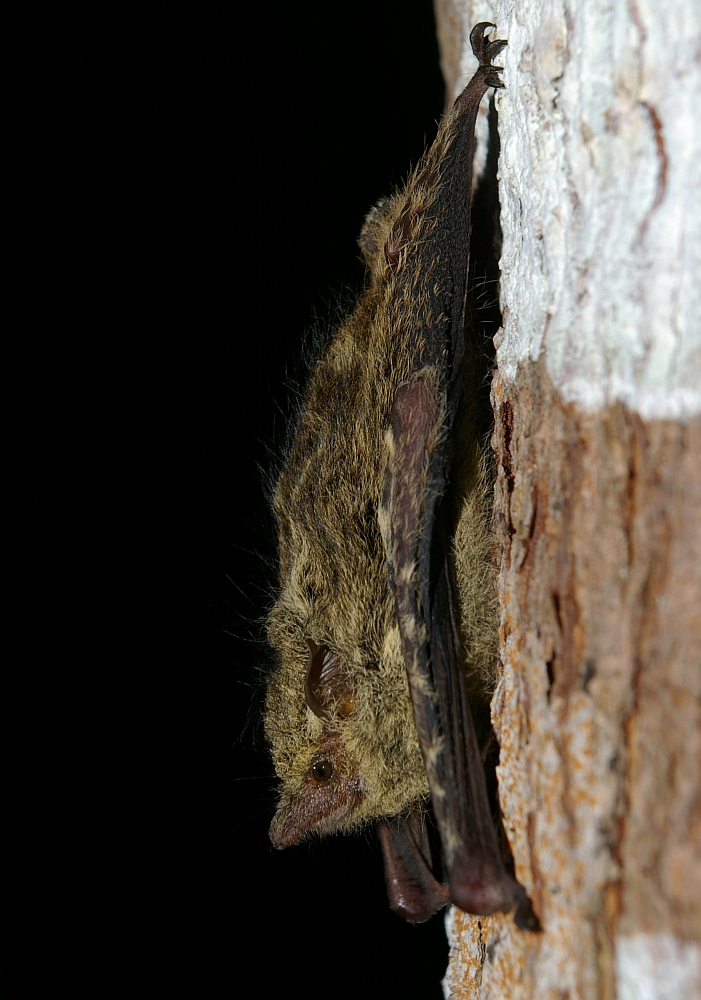

Conservation status
- Least Concern (IUCN 3.1)

Scientific classification
- Kingdom: Animalia
- Phylum: Chordata
- Class: Mammalia
- Order: Chiroptera
- Family: Emballonuridae
- Genus: Rhynchonycteris; Peters, 1867
- Species: R. naso

Binomial name
- Rhynchonycteris naso (Wied-Neuwied, 1820)
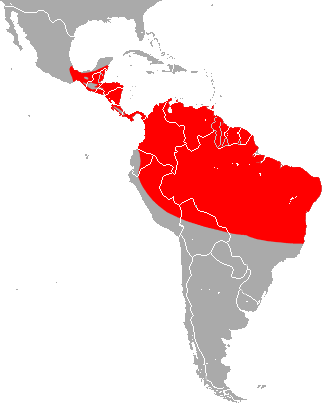
- Proboscis bat range

Synonyms
- Vespertilio naso

= Proboscis bat =

Species of bat

The proboscis bat (Rhynchonycteris naso) is a species of bat found in South America and Central America. Other common names include long-nosed proboscis bat, sharp-nosed bat, Brazilian long-nosed bat, and river bat. It is the only species in the genus Rhynchonycteris.

This species is in the family Emballonuridae, the sac-winged or sheath-tailed bats. Like most bats, it is nocturnal. It is found from southern Mexico to Belize, Peru, Venezuela, Bolivia and Brazil, as well as in Trinidad.

== Characteristics ==
This is a small bat, with a head-and-body length of 37–43 mm (1.5–1.7 in), a tail length of around 12 mm (0.47 in), and a forearm length of 35–41 mm (1.4–1.6 in). A sample of males and females from Trinidad found weights ranging between 2.1–4.3 g (0.074–0.152 oz). Males in northern South America were found to average 56 millimetres (2.2 in) long, females 59 millimetres (2.3 in). The tail is about 16 millimetres (0.63 in) long. Pregnant females can weigh up to 6 grams (0.21 oz).

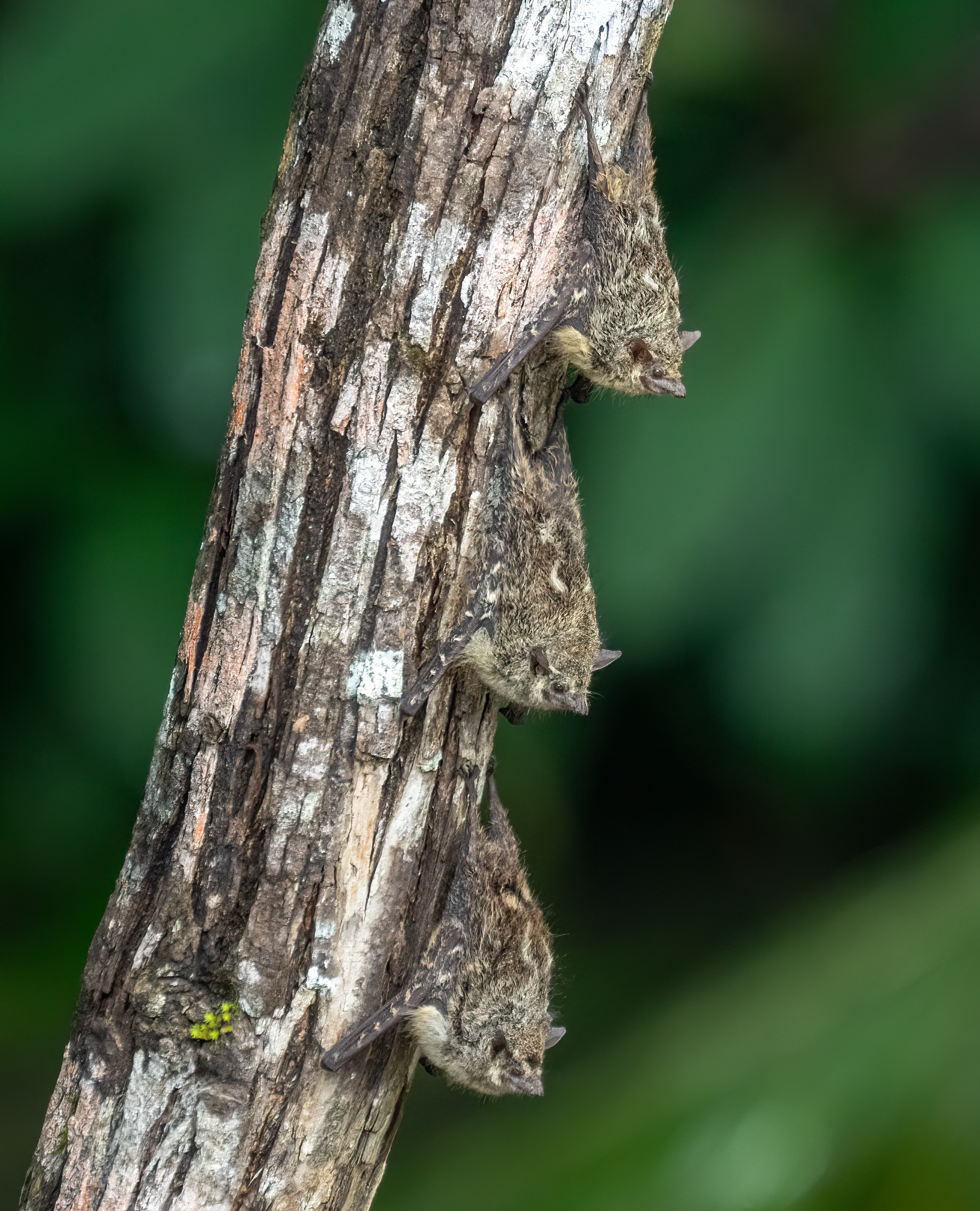
In Costa Rica

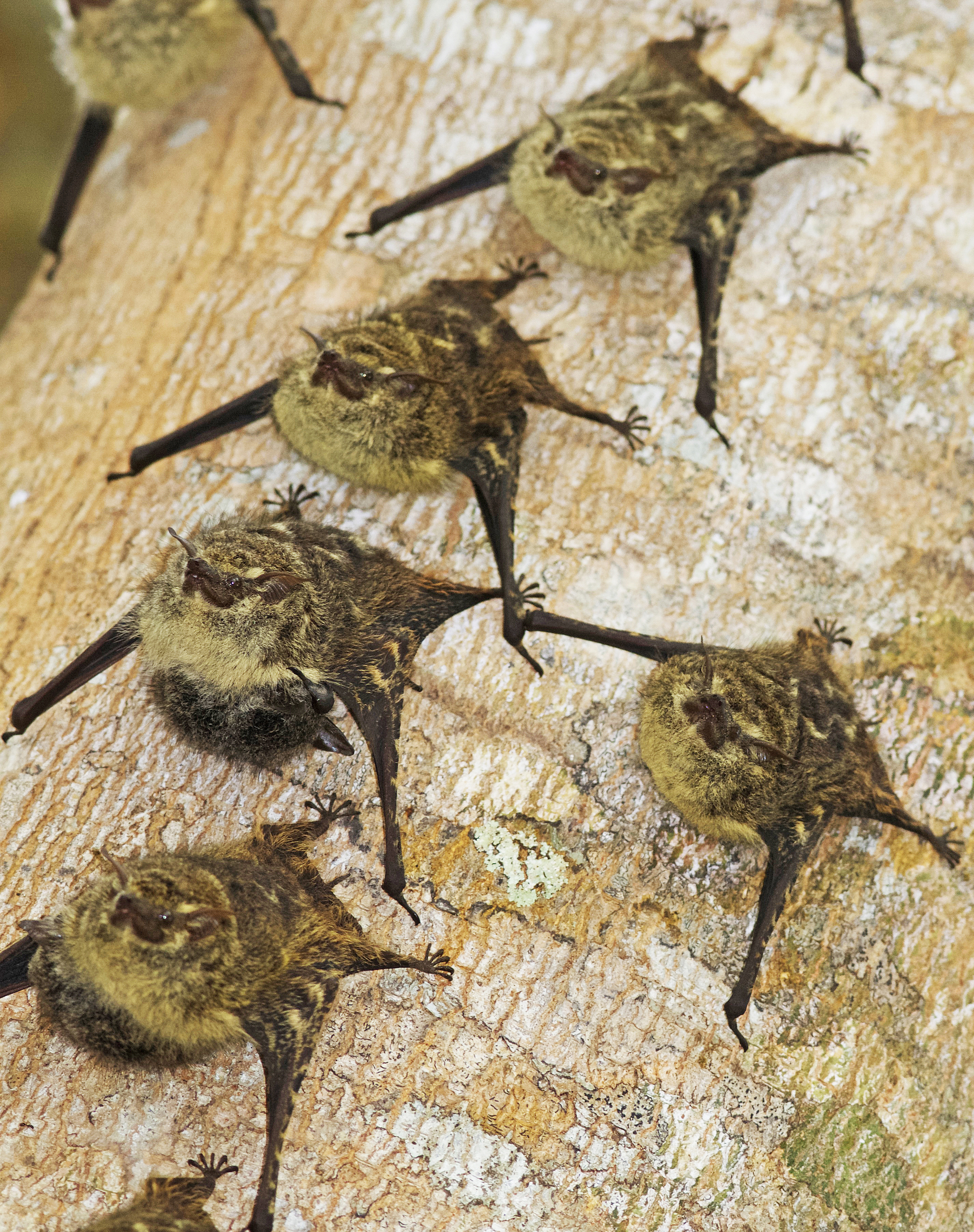
In Costa Rica. The two on the lower left are carrying young.

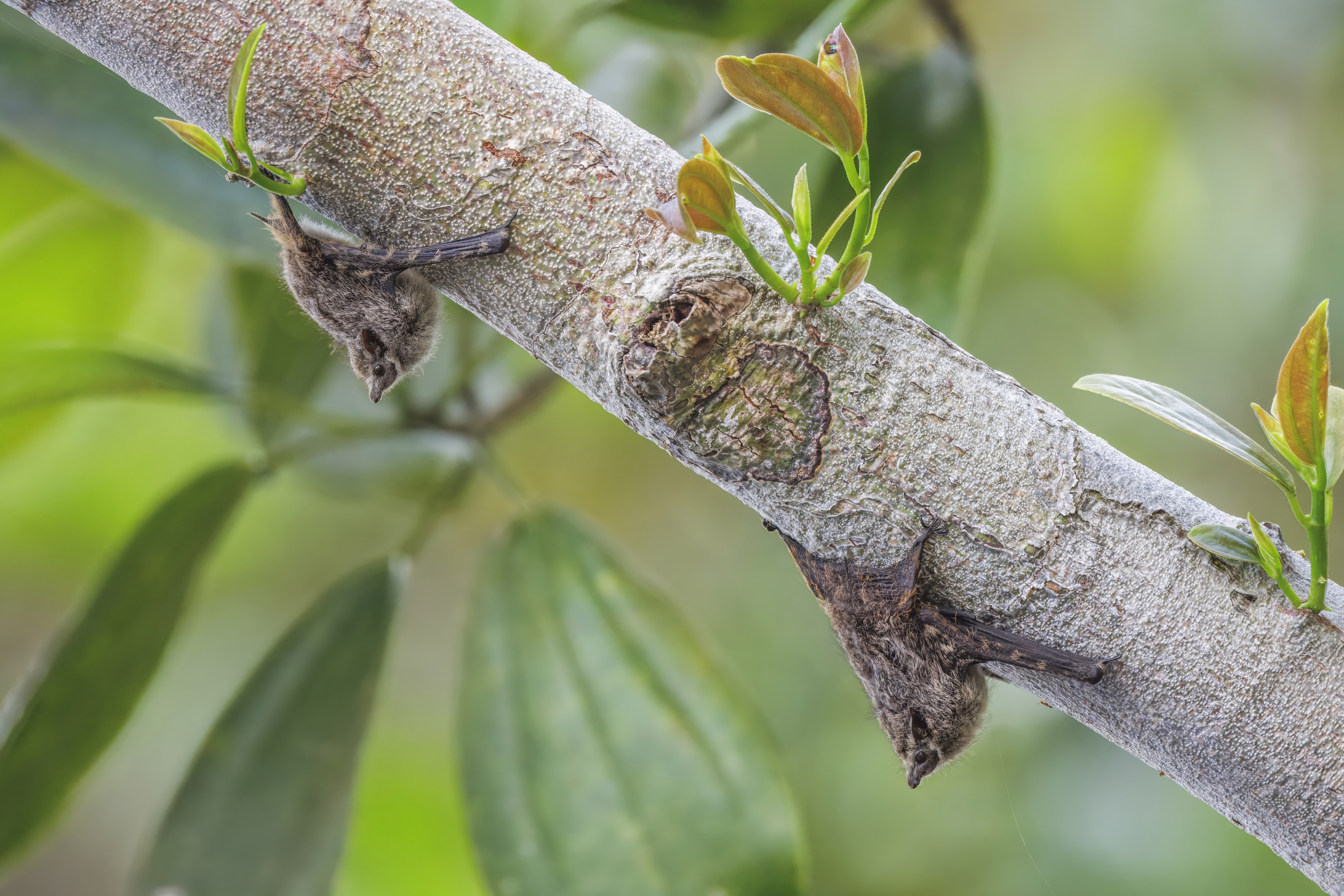
In Ecuador, juvenile on left

== Habitat ==
This species is found in the lowlands of the northern half of South America, throughout Central America, and into southeastern Mexico. From Ecuador south, it is limited to east of the Andes; its range extends south to the northern half of Bolivia and much of Brazil. It seldom occurs above 300 meters (980 feet) in elevation. Its habitats include forests, caves and non-aquatic underground habitats. It usually lives around wetlands and is frequently found in riparian forests, pastures swamps, and all near water.

== Habits ==
Proboscis bats live in groups. The colonies are usually between five and ten individuals, and very rarely exceed forty. The bats are nocturnal, sleeping during the day in an unusual formation: most of them line up, one after another, on a branch or wooden beam, nose to tail, in a straight row.

A colony of proboscis bats usually has a regular feeding area, typically a small patch of water. Here the bats catch insects (in the form of midges [including chironomids], mosquitoes, beetles, and caddisflies) using echolocation. They have no specific breeding season, forming stable year-round harems. One young is born per female. Both sexes disperse after weaning at around 2–4 months.

This small species of bat has been found to occasionally fall prey to the large spider Argiope submaronica.
