= List of mammals of Nicaragua =

This is a list of the mammal species recorded in Nicaragua. Of the mammal species in Nicaragua, two are endangered, four are vulnerable, and four are near threatened. One species has been classified as extinct.

The following tags are used to highlight each species' conservation status as assessed by the International Union for Conservation of Nature:

EX	Extinct	No reasonable doubt that the last individual has died.
EW	Extinct in the wild	Known only to survive in captivity or as a naturalized populations well outside its previous range.
CR	Critically endangered	The species is in imminent risk of extinction in the wild.
EN	Endangered	The species is facing an extremely high risk of extinction in the wild.
VU	Vulnerable	The species is facing a high risk of extinction in the wild.
NT	Near threatened	The species does not meet any of the criteria that would categorise it as risking extinction but it is likely to do so in the future.
LC	Least concern	There are no current identifiable risks to the species.
DD	Data deficient	There is inadequate information to make an assessment of the risks to this species.

Some species were assessed using an earlier set of criteria. Species assessed using this system have the following instead of near threatened and least concern categories:

LR/cd	Lower risk/conservation dependent	Species which were the focus of conservation programmes and may have moved into a higher risk category if that programme was discontinued.
LR/nt	Lower risk/near threatened	Species which are close to being classified as vulnerable but are not the subject of conservation programmes.
LR/lc	Lower risk/least concern	Species for which there are no identifiable risks.

== Subclass: Theria ==
=== Infraclass: Metatheria ===
==== Order: Didelphimorphia (common opossums) ====
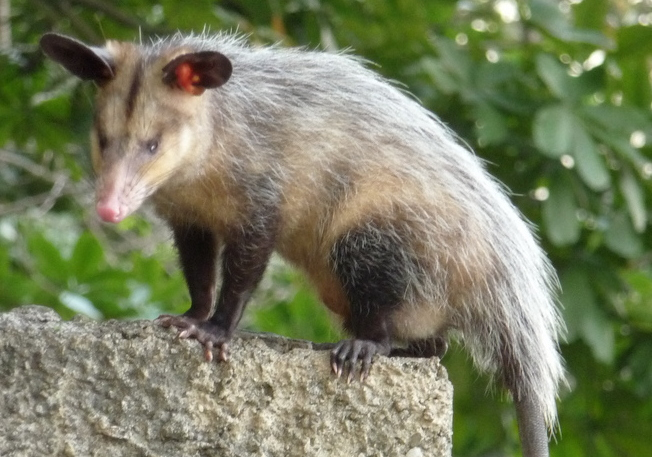
Common opossum

Didelphimorphia is the order of common opossums of the Western Hemisphere. Opossums probably diverged from the basic South American marsupials in the late Cretaceous or early Paleocene. They are small to medium-sized marsupials, about the size of a large house cat, with a long snout and prehensile tail.

- Family: Didelphidae (American opossums)
  - Subfamily: Caluromyinae
    - Genus: Caluromys
      - Derby's woolly opossum, Caluromys derbianus VU
  - Subfamily: Didelphinae
    - Genus: Chironectes
      - Water opossum, Chironectes minimus LR/nt
    - Genus: Didelphis
      - Common opossum, Didelphis marsupialis LR/lc
      - Virginia opossum, Didelphis virginiana LR/lc
    - Genus: Marmosa
      - Alston's mouse opossum, Marmosa alstoni LR/nt
      - Mexican mouse opossum, Marmosa mexicana LR/lc
    - Genus: Metachirus
      - Brown four-eyed opossum, Metachirus nudicaudatus LR/lc
    - Genus: Philander
      - Gray four-eyed opossum, Philander opossum LR/lc

=== Infraclass: Eutheria ===
==== Order: Sirenia (manatees and dugongs) ====
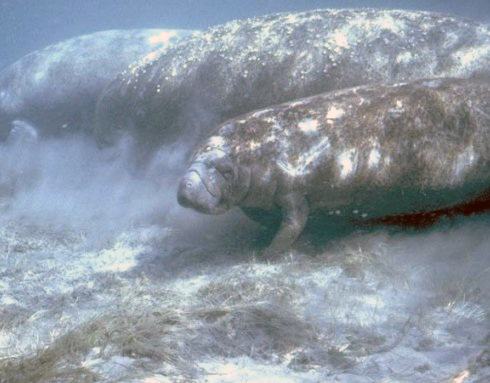
West Indian manatees

Sirenia is an order of fully aquatic, herbivorous mammals that inhabit rivers, estuaries, coastal marine waters, swamps, and marine wetlands. All four species are endangered.

- Family: Trichechidae
  - Genus: Trichechus
    - West Indian manatee, T. manatus VU

==== Order: Cingulata (armadillos) ====
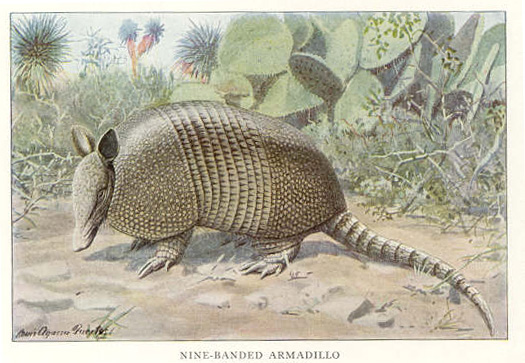
Nine-banded armadillo

The armadillos are small mammals with a bony armored shell. They are native to the Americas. There are around 20 extant species.

- Family: Dasypodidae (armadillos)
  - Subfamily: Dasypodinae
    - Genus: Dasypus
      - Nine-banded armadillo, Dasypus novemcinctus LC
  - Subfamily: Tolypeutinae
    - Genus: Cabassous
      - Northern naked-tailed armadillo, Cabassous centralis DD

==== Order: Pilosa (anteaters, sloths and tamanduas) ====
The order Pilosa is extant only in the Americas and includes the anteaters, sloths, and tamanduas.

- Suborder: Folivora
  - Family: Bradypodidae (three-toed sloths)
    - Genus: Bradypus
      - Brown-throated three-toed sloth, Bradypus variegatus LC
  - Family: Choloepodidae (two-toed sloths)
    - Genus: Choloepus
      - Hoffmann's two-toed sloth, Choloepus hoffmanni LC
- Suborder: Vermilingua
  - Family: Cyclopedidae
    - Genus: Cyclopes
      - Silky anteater, C. didactylus LC
      - Central American silky anteater, C. dorsalis NE
  - Family: Myrmecophagidae (American anteaters)
    - Genus: Myrmecophaga
      - Giant anteater, Myrmecophaga tridactyla VU
    - Genus: Tamandua
      - Northern tamandua, Tamandua mexicana LC

==== Order: Primates ====
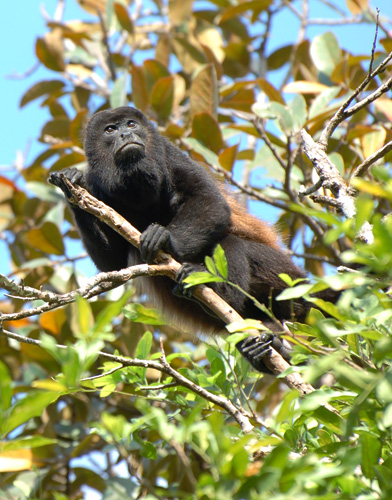
Mantled howler

The order Primates contains humans and their closest relatives: lemurs, lorisoids, tarsiers, monkeys, and apes.

- Suborder: Haplorhini
  - Infraorder: Simiiformes
    - Parvorder: Platyrrhini (New World monkeys)
      - Family: Cebidae
        - Subfamily: Cebinae
          - Genus: Cebus
            - Panamanian white-faced capuchin, Cebus capucinus LC
      - Family: Atelidae
        - Subfamily: Alouattinae
          - Genus: Alouatta
            - Mantled howler, Alouatta palliata LC
        - Subfamily: Atelinae
          - Genus: Ateles
            - Geoffroy's spider monkey, Ateles geoffroyi LC

==== Order: Rodentia (rodents) ====
Rodents make up the largest order of mammals, with over 40% of mammalian species. They have two incisors in the upper and lower jaw which grow continually and must be kept short by gnawing. Most rodents are small though the capybara can weigh up to 45 kg (99 lb).

- Suborder: Hystricognathi
  - Family: Erethizontidae (New World porcupines)
    - Subfamily: Erethizontinae
      - Genus: Coendou
        - Mexican hairy dwarf porcupine, Coendou mexicanus LR/lc
  - Family: Dasyproctidae (agoutis and pacas)
    - Genus: Dasyprocta
      - Central American agouti, Dasyprocta punctata LR/lc
  - Family: Cuniculidae
    - Genus: Cuniculus
      - Lowland paca, Cuniculus paca LC
  - Family: Echimyidae
    - Subfamily: Eumysopinae
      - Genus: Hoplomys
        - Armored rat, Hoplomys gymnurus LR/lc
      - Genus: Proechimys
        - Tome's spiny-rat, Proechimys semispinosus LR/lc
- Suborder: Sciurognathi
  - Family: Sciuridae (squirrels)
    - Subfamily: Sciurinae
      - Tribe: Sciurini
        - Genus: Microsciurus
          - Central American dwarf squirrel, Microsciurus alfari LR/lc
        - Genus: Sciurus
          - Deppe's squirrel, Sciurus deppei LR/lc
          - Richmond's squirrel, Sciurus richmondi LR/nt
          - Variegated squirrel, Sciurus variegatoides LR/lc
  - Family: Geomyidae
    - Genus: Orthogeomys
      - Nicaraguan pocket gopher, Orthogeomys matagalpae LR/lc
  - Family: Heteromyidae
    - Subfamily: Heteromyinae
      - Genus: Heteromys
        - Desmarest's spiny pocket mouse, Heteromys desmarestianus LR/lc
        - Salvin's spiny pocket mouse, Heteromys salvini LR/lc
  - Family: Cricetidae
    - Subfamily: Tylomyinae
      - Genus: Nyctomys
        - Sumichrast's vesper rat, Nyctomys sumichrasti LR/lc
      - Genus: Ototylomys
        - Big-eared climbing rat, Ototylomys phyllotis LR/lc
      - Genus: Tylomys
        - Peters's climbing rat, Tylomys nudicaudus LR/lc
    - Subfamily: Neotominae
      - Genus: Baiomys
        - Southern pygmy mouse, Baiomys musculus LR/lc
      - Genus: Neotoma
        - Nicaraguan woodrat, Neotoma chrysomelas LR/lc
      - Genus: Peromyscus
        - Naked-eared deer mouse, Peromyscus gymnotis LR/lc
        - Mexican deer mouse, Peromyscus mexicanus LR/lc
        - Stirton's deer mouse, Peromyscus stirtoni LR/lc
      - Genus: Reithrodontomys
        - Short-nosed harvest mouse, Reithrodontomys brevirostris LR/lc
        - Fulvous harvest mouse, Reithrodontomys fulvescens LR/lc
        - Slender harvest mouse, Reithrodontomys gracilis LR/lc
        - Mexican harvest mouse, Reithrodontomys mexicanus LR/lc
        - Nicaraguan harvest mouse, Reithrodontomys paradoxus LR/nt
        - Sumichrast's harvest mouse, Reithrodontomys sumichrasti LR/lc
      - Genus: Scotinomys
        - Alston's brown mouse, Scotinomys teguina LR/lc
    - Subfamily: Sigmodontinae
      - Genus: Melanomys
        - Dusky rice rat, Melanomys caliginosus LR/lc
      - Genus: Oligoryzomys
        - Fulvous pygmy rice rat, Oligoryzomys fulvescens LR/lc
      - Genus: Oryzomys
        - Alfaro's rice rat, Oryzomys alfaroi LR/lc
        - Bolivar rice rat, Oryzomys bolivaris LR/lc
        - Coues' rice rat, Oryzomys couesi LR/lc
        - Nicaraguan rice rat, Oryzomys dimidiatus LR/nt
        - Long-nosed rice rat, Oryzomys rostratus LR/lc
        - Cloud forest rice rat, Oryzomys saturatior LR/lc
      - Genus: Sigmodon
        - Southern cotton rat, Sigmodon hirsutus LC
      - Genus: Sigmodontomys
        - Alfaro's rice water rat, Sigmodontomys alfari LR/lc

==== Order: Lagomorpha (lagomorphs) ====
The lagomorphs comprise two families, Leporidae (hares and rabbits), and Ochotonidae (pikas). Though they can resemble rodents, and were classified as a superfamily in that order until the early 20th century, they have since been considered a separate order. They differ from rodents in a number of physical characteristics, such as having four incisors in the upper jaw rather than two.

- Family: Leporidae (rabbits, hares)
  - Genus: Sylvilagus
    - Eastern cottontail, Sylvilagus floridanus LR/lc
    - Central American tapetí, Sylvilagus gabbi LC

==== Order: Eulipotyphla (shrews, hedgehogs, moles, and solenodons) ====
Eulipotyphlans are insectivorous mammals. Shrews and solenodons closely resemble mice, hedgehogs carry spines, while moles are stout-bodied burrowers.

- Family: Soricidae (shrews)
  - Subfamily: Soricinae
    - Tribe: Blarinini
      - Genus: Cryptotis
        - Honduran small-eared shrew, Cryptotis hondurensis VU
        - North American least shrew, Cryptotis parva LR/lc

==== Order: Chiroptera (bats) ====
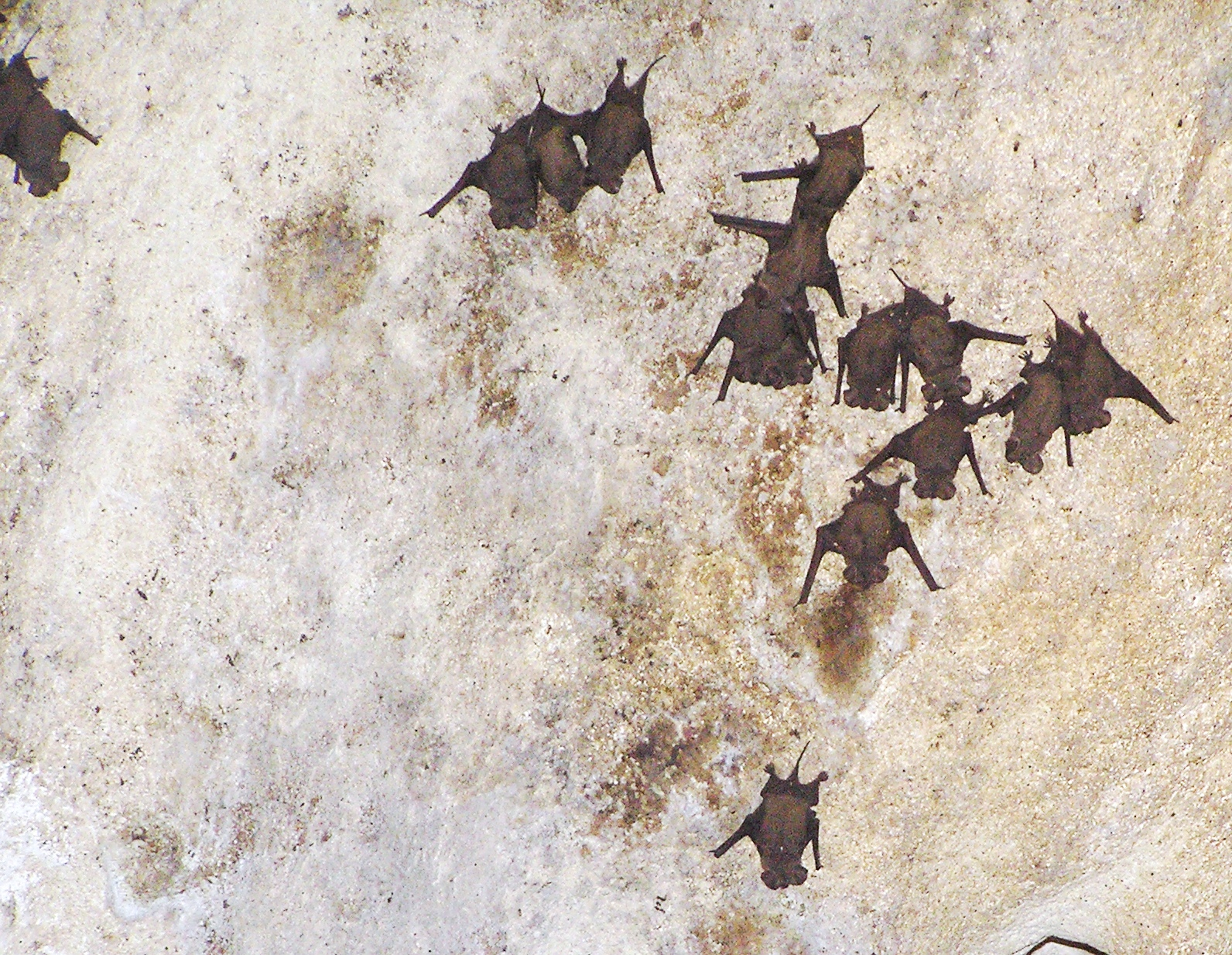
Mexican free-tailed bats

The bats' most distinguishing feature is that their forelimbs are developed as wings, making them the only mammals capable of flight. Bat species account for about 20% of all mammals.

- Family: Noctilionidae
  - Genus: Noctilio
    - Lesser bulldog bat, Noctilio albiventris LR/lc
    - Greater bulldog bat, Noctilio leporinus LR/lc
- Family: Vespertilionidae
  - Subfamily: Myotinae
    - Genus: Myotis
      - Silver-tipped myotis, Myotis albescens LR/lc
      - Elegant myotis, Myotis elegans LR/nt
      - Hairy-legged myotis, Myotis keaysi LR/lc
      - Black myotis, Myotis nigricans LR/lc
      - Riparian myotis, Myotis riparius LR/lc
  - Subfamily: Vespertilioninae
    - Genus: Eptesicus
      - Brazilian brown bat, Eptesicus brasiliensis LR/lc
      - Argentine brown bat, Eptesicus furinalis LR/lc
      - Big brown bat, Eptesicus fuscus LR/lc
    - Genus: Lasiurus
      - Desert red bat, Lasiurus blossevillii LR/lc
      - Southern yellow bat, Lasiurus ega LR/lc
    - Genus: Rhogeessa
      - Black-winged little yellow bat, Rhogeessa tumida LR/lc
- Family: Molossidae
  - Genus: Eumops
    - Black bonneted bat, Eumops auripendulus LR/lc
    - Dwarf bonneted bat, Eumops bonariensis LR/lc
    - Wagner's bonneted bat, Eumops glaucinus LR/lc
    - Underwood's bonneted bat, Eumops underwoodi LR/nt
  - Genus: Molossus
    - Aztec mastiff bat, Molossus aztecus LR/nt
    - Bonda mastiff bat, Molossus bondae LR/lc
    - Velvety free-tailed bat, Molossus molossus LR/lc
    - Miller's mastiff bat, Molossus pretiosus LR/lc
    - Sinaloan mastiff bat, Molossus sinaloae LR/lc
  - Genus: Promops
    - Big crested mastiff bat, Promops centralis LR/lc
  - Genus: Tadarida
    - Mexican free-tailed bat, Tadarida brasiliensis LR/nt
- Family: Emballonuridae
  - Genus: Balantiopteryx
    - Gray sac-winged bat, Balantiopteryx plicata LR/lc
  - Genus: Cormura
    - Wagner's sac-winged bat, Cormura brevirostris LR/lc
  - Genus: Cyttarops
    - Short-eared bat, Cyttarops alecto LR/nt
  - Genus: Diclidurus
    - Northern ghost bat, Diclidurus albus LR/lc
  - Genus: Peropteryx
    - Greater dog-like bat, Peropteryx kappleri LR/lc
    - Lesser doglike bat, Peropteryx macrotis LR/lc
  - Genus: Rhynchonycteris
    - Proboscis bat, Rhynchonycteris naso LR/lc
  - Genus: Saccopteryx
    - Greater sac-winged bat, Saccopteryx bilineata LR/lc
    - Lesser sac-winged bat, Saccopteryx leptura LR/lc
- Family: Mormoopidae
  - Genus: Mormoops
    - Ghost-faced bat, Mormoops megalophylla LR/lc
  - Genus: Pteronotus
    - Naked-backed bat, Pteronotus davyi LR/lc
    - Big naked-backed bat, Pteronotus gymnonotus LR/lc
    - Parnell's mustached bat, Pteronotus parnellii LR/lc
    - Wagner's mustached bat, Pteronotus personatus LR/lc
- Family: Phyllostomidae
  - Subfamily: Phyllostominae
    - Genus: Chrotopterus
      - Big-eared woolly bat, Chrotopterus auritus LR/lc
    - Genus: Glyphonycteris
      - Tricolored big-eared bat, Glyphonycteris sylvestris LR/nt
    - Genus: Lampronycteris
      - Yellow-throated big-eared bat, Lampronycteris brachyotis LR/lc
    - Genus: Lophostoma
      - Pygmy round-eared bat, Lophostoma brasiliense LR/lc
      - White-throated round-eared bat, Lophostoma silvicolum LR/lc
    - Genus: Macrophyllum
      - Long-legged bat, Macrophyllum macrophyllum LR/lc
    - Genus: Micronycteris
      - Hairy big-eared bat, Micronycteris hirsuta LR/lc
      - White-bellied big-eared bat, Micronycteris minuta LR/lc
      - Schmidts's big-eared bat, Micronycteris schmidtorum LR/lc
    - Genus: Mimon
      - Striped hairy-nosed bat, Mimon crenulatum LR/lc
    - Genus: Phyllostomus
      - Pale spear-nosed bat, Phyllostomus discolor LR/lc
      - Greater spear-nosed bat, Phyllostomus hastatus LR/lc
    - Genus: Tonatia
      - Stripe-headed round-eared bat, Tonatia saurophila LR/lc
    - Genus: Trachops
      - Fringe-lipped bat, Trachops cirrhosus LR/lc
    - Genus: Trinycteris
      - Niceforo's big-eared bat, Trinycteris nicefori LR/lc
    - Genus: Vampyrum
      - Spectral bat, Vampyrum spectrum LR/nt
  - Subfamily: Lonchophyllinae
    - Genus: Lonchophylla
      - Orange nectar bat, Lonchophylla robusta LR/lc
  - Subfamily: Glossophaginae
    - Genus: Anoura
      - Geoffroy's tailless bat, Anoura geoffroyi LR/lc
    - Genus: Choeroniscus
      - Godman's long-tailed bat, Choeroniscus godmani LR/nt
    - Genus: Glossophaga
      - Commissaris's long-tongued bat, Glossophaga commissarisi LR/lc
      - Gray long-tongued bat, Glossophaga leachii LR/lc
      - Pallas's long-tongued bat, Glossophaga soricina LR/lc
    - Genus: Hylonycteris
      - Underwood's long-tongued bat, Hylonycteris underwoodi LR/nt
    - Genus: Lichonycteris
      - Dark long-tongued bat, Lichonycteris obscura LR/lc
  - Subfamily: Carolliinae
    - Genus: Carollia
      - Silky short-tailed bat, Carollia brevicauda LR/lc
      - Chestnut short-tailed bat, Carollia castanea LR/lc
      - Seba's short-tailed bat, Carollia perspicillata LR/lc
      - Gray short-tailed bat, Carollia subrufa LR/lc
  - Subfamily: Stenodermatinae
    - Genus: Artibeus
      - Honduran fruit-eating bat, Artibeus inopinatus VU
      - Artibeus intermedius LR/lc
      - Jamaican fruit bat, Artibeus jamaicensis LR/lc
      - Great fruit-eating bat, Artibeus lituratus LR/lc
      - Pygmy fruit-eating bat, Artibeus phaeotis LR/lc
      - Toltec fruit-eating bat, Artibeus toltecus LR/lc
    - Genus: Centurio
      - Wrinkle-faced bat, Centurio senex LR/lc
    - Genus: Chiroderma
      - Hairy big-eyed bat, Chiroderma villosum LR/lc
    - Genus: Ectophylla
      - Honduran white bat, Ectophylla alba LR/nt
    - Genus: Mesophylla
      - MacConnell's bat, Mesophylla macconnelli LR/lc
    - Genus: Sturnira
      - Little yellow-shouldered bat, Sturnira lilium LR/lc
      - Highland yellow-shouldered bat, Sturnira ludovici LR/lc
    - Genus: Uroderma
      - Tent-making bat, Uroderma bilobatum LR/lc
      - Brown tent-making bat, Uroderma magnirostrum LR/lc
    - Genus: Vampyressa
      - Striped yellow-eared bat, Vampyressa nymphaea LR/lc
      - Southern little yellow-eared bat, Vampyressa pusilla LR/lc
    - Genus: Vampyrodes
      - Great stripe-faced bat, Vampyrodes caraccioli LR/lc
    - Genus: Platyrrhinus
      - Heller's broad-nosed bat, Platyrrhinus helleri LR/lc
  - Subfamily: Desmodontinae
    - Genus: Desmodus
      - Common vampire bat, Desmodus rotundus LR/lc
    - Genus: Diaemus
      - White-winged vampire bat, Diaemus youngi LR/lc
    - Genus: Diphylla
      - Hairy-legged vampire bat, Diphylla ecaudata LR/nt
- Family: Thyropteridae
  - Genus: Thyroptera
    - Peters's disk-winged bat, Thyroptera discifera LR/lc
    - Spix's disk-winged bat, Thyroptera tricolor LR/lc

==== Order: Cetacea (whales) ====
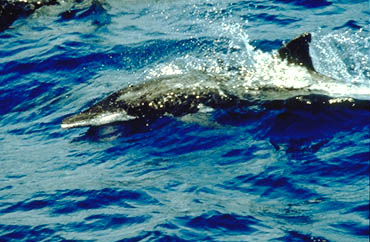
Rough-toothed dolphin

The order Cetacea includes whales, dolphins and porpoises. They are the mammals most fully adapted to aquatic life with a spindle-shaped nearly hairless body, protected by a thick layer of blubber, and forelimbs and tail modified to provide propulsion underwater.

- Suborder: Mysticeti
  - Family: Balaenopteridae (baleen whales)
    - Genus: Balaenoptera
      - Common minke whale, Balaenoptera acutorostrata
      - Sei whale, Balaenoptera borealis
      - Bryde's whale, Balaenoptera brydei
      - Blue whale, Balaenoptera musculus
    - Genus: Megaptera
      - Humpback whale, Megaptera novaeangliae
- Suborder: Odontoceti
  - Superfamily: Platanistoidea
    - Family: Delphinidae (marine dolphins)
      - Genus: Delphinus
        - Short-beaked common dolphin, Delphinus delphis DD
      - Genus: Feresa
        - Pygmy killer whale, Feresa attenuata DD
      - Genus: Globicephala
        - Short-finned pilot whale, Globicephala macrorhyncus DD
      - Genus: Lagenodelphis
        - Fraser's dolphin, Lagenodelphis hosei DD
      - Genus: Grampus
        - Risso's dolphin, Grampus griseus DD
      - Genus: Orcinus
        - Killer whale, Orcinus orca DD
      - Genus: Peponocephala
        - Melon-headed whale, Peponocephala electra DD
      - Genus: Pseudorca
        - False killer whale, Pseudorca crassidens DD
      - Genus: Sotalia
        - Guiana dolphin, Sotalia guianensis DD
      - Genus: Stenella
        - Pantropical spotted dolphin, Stenella attenuata DD
        - Clymene dolphin, Stenella clymene DD
        - Striped dolphin, Stenella coeruleoalba DD
        - Atlantic spotted dolphin, Stenella frontalis DD
        - Spinner dolphin, Stenella longirostris DD
      - Genus: Steno
        - Rough-toothed dolphin, Steno bredanensis DD
      - Genus: Tursiops
        - Common bottlenose dolphin, Tursiops truncatus
    - Family: Physeteridae (sperm whales)
      - Genus: Physeter
        - Sperm whale, Physeter catodon DD
    - Family: Kogiidae (dwarf sperm whales)
      - Genus: Kogia
        - Pygmy sperm whale, Kogia breviceps DD
        - Dwarf sperm whale, Kogia sima DD
  - Superfamily Ziphioidea
    - Family: Ziphidae (beaked whales)
      - Genus: Mesoplodon
        - Gervais' beaked whale, Mesoplodon europaeus DD
        - Ginkgo-toothed beaked whale, Mesoplodon ginkgodens DD
        - Pygmy beaked whale, Mesoplodon peruvianus DD
      - Genus: Ziphius
        - Cuvier's beaked whale, Ziphius cavirostris DD

==== Order: Carnivora (carnivorans) ====
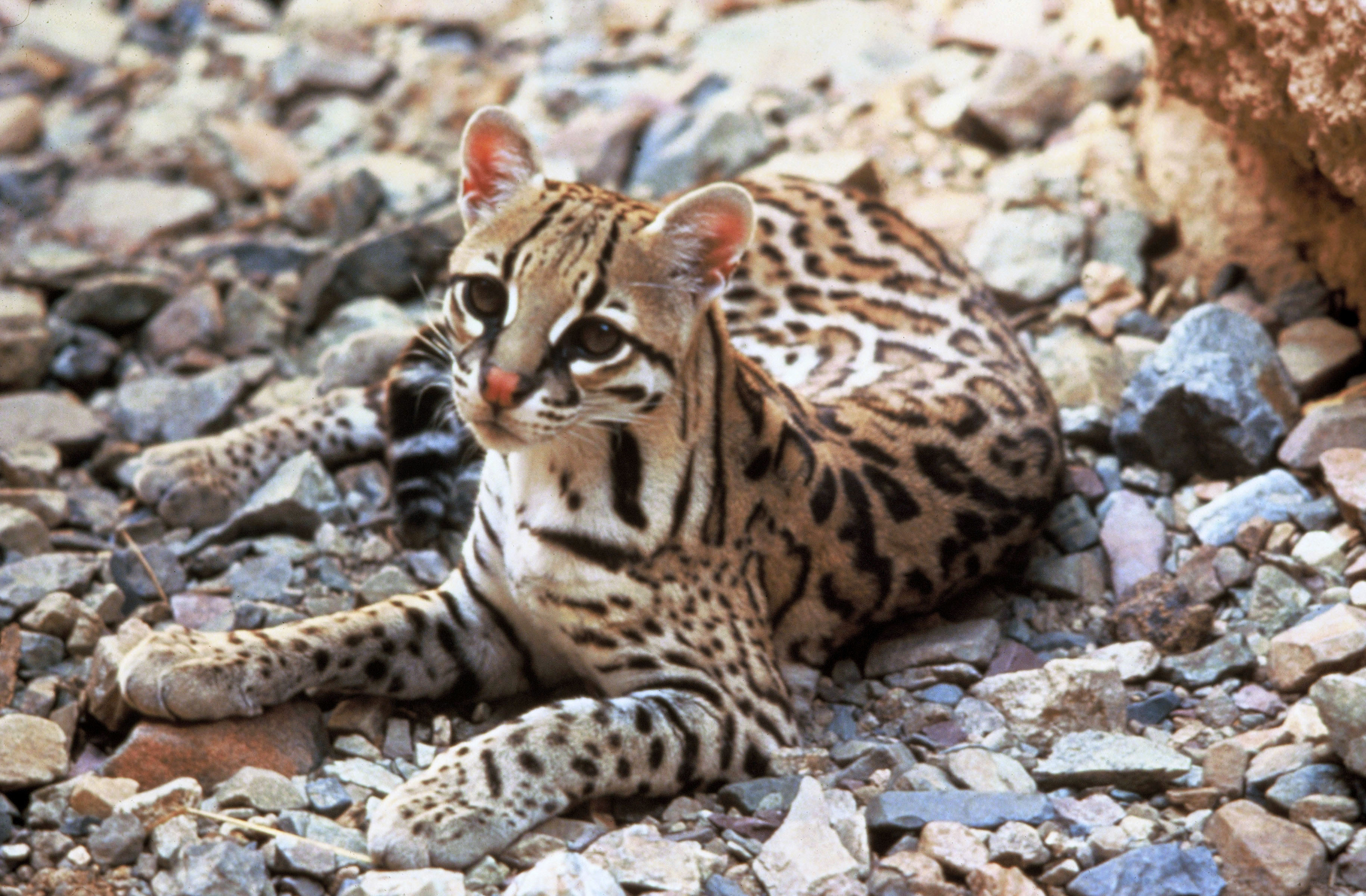
Ocelot

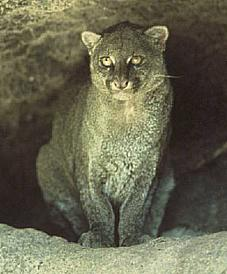
Jaguarundi

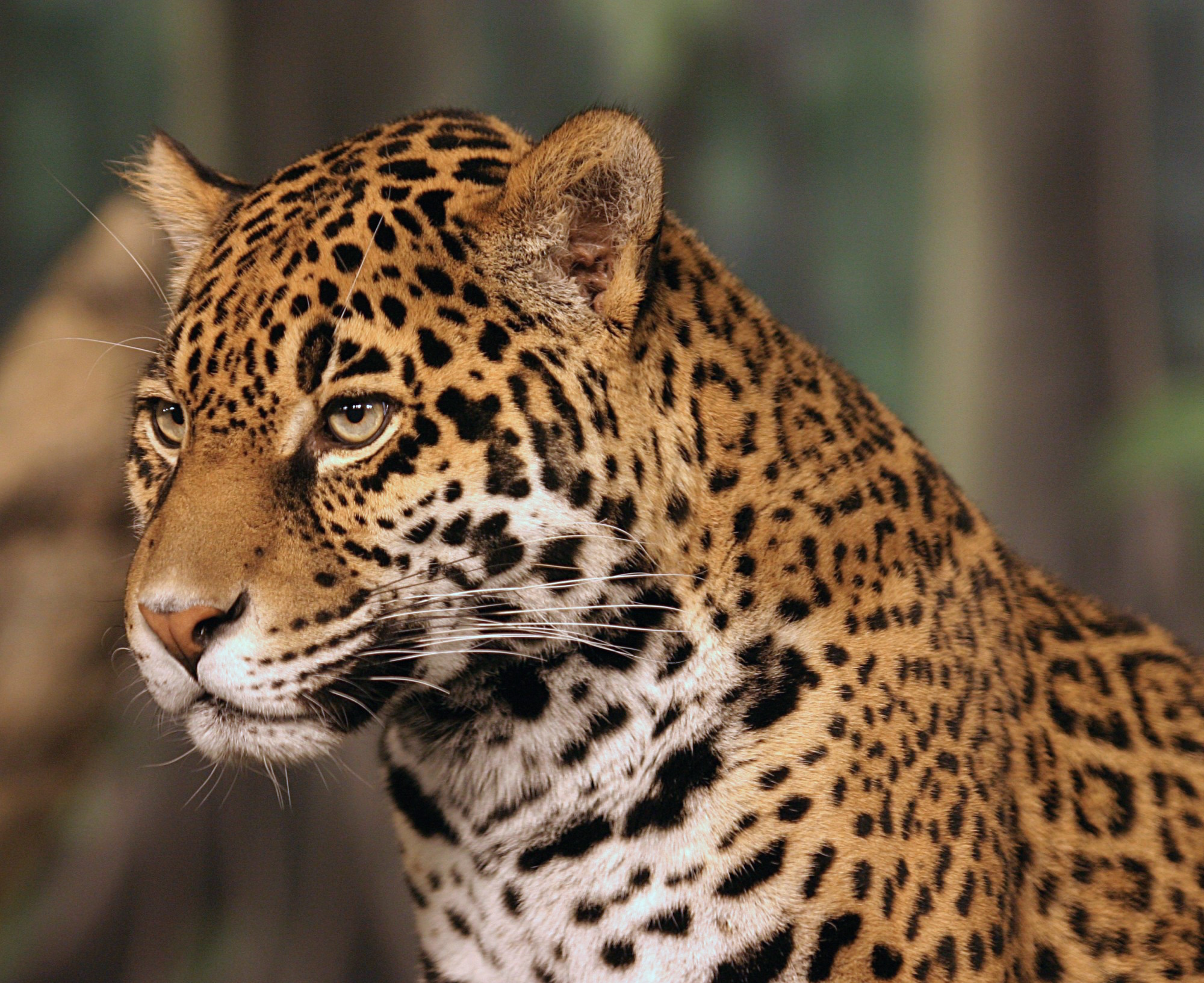
Jaguar

There are over 260 species of carnivorans, the majority of which primarily eat meat. They have a characteristic skull shape and dentition.

- Suborder: Feliformia
  - Family: Felidae (cats)
    - Subfamily: Felinae
      - Genus: Herpailurus
        - Jaguarundi, Herpailurus yagouaroundi LC
      - Genus: Leopardus
        - Ocelot, Leopardus pardalis LC
        - Oncilla, Leopardus tigrinus NT
        - Margay, Leopardus wiedii LC
      - Genus: Puma
        - Cougar, Puma concolor NT
    - Subfamily: Pantherinae
      - Genus: Panthera
        - Jaguar, Panthera onca NT
- Suborder: Caniformia
  - Family: Canidae (dogs, foxes)
    - Genus: Canis
      - Coyote, Canis latrans LC
    - Genus: Urocyon
      - Gray fox, Urocyon cinereoargenteus LC
  - Family: Procyonidae (raccoons)
    - Genus: Bassaricyon
      - Northern olingo, Bassaricyon gabbii LR/nt
    - Genus: Bassariscus
      - Cacomistle, Bassariscus sumichrasti LR/nt
    - Genus: Nasua
      - White-nosed coati, Nasua narica LR/lc
    - Genus: Potos
      - Kinkajou, Potos flavus LR/lc
    - Genus: Procyon
      - Common raccoon, Procyon lotor LR/lc
  - Family: Mustelidae (mustelids)
    - Genus: Eira
      - Tayra, Eira barbara LR/lc
    - Genus: Galictis
      - Greater grison, Galictis vittata LR/lc
    - Genus: Lontra
      - Neotropical river otter, Lontra longicaudis NT
    - Genus: Neogale
      - Long-tailed weasel, Neogale frenata LR/lc
  - Family: Mephitidae
    - Genus: Conepatus
      - American hog-nosed skunk, Conepatus leuconotus LR/lc
      - Striped hog-nosed skunk, Conepatus semistriatus LR/lc
    - Genus: Mephitis
      - Hooded skunk, Mephitis macroura LR/lc
    - Genus: Spilogale
      - Eastern spotted skunk, Spilogale putorius LR/lc
- Suborder: Pinnipedia
  - Family: Phocidae (earless seals)
    - Genus: Neomonachus
      - Caribbean monk seal, Neomonachus tropicalis EX

==== Order: Perissodactyla (odd-toed ungulates) ====
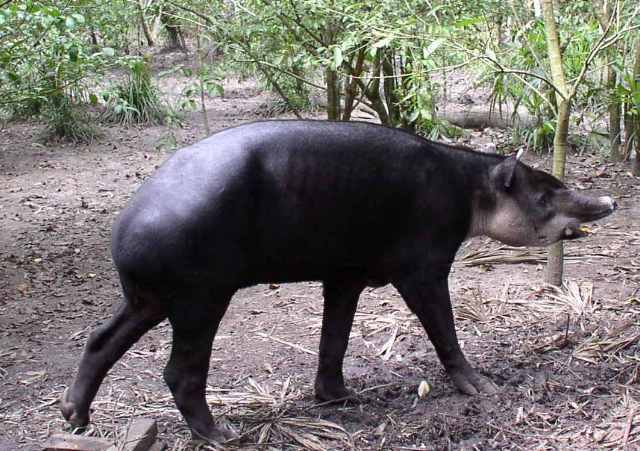
Baird's tapir

The odd-toed ungulates are browsing and grazing mammals. They are usually large to very large, and have relatively simple stomachs and a large middle toe.

- Family: Tapiridae (tapirs)
  - Genus: Tapirus
    - Baird's tapir, Tapirus bairdii EN

==== Order: Artiodactyla (even-toed ungulates) ====
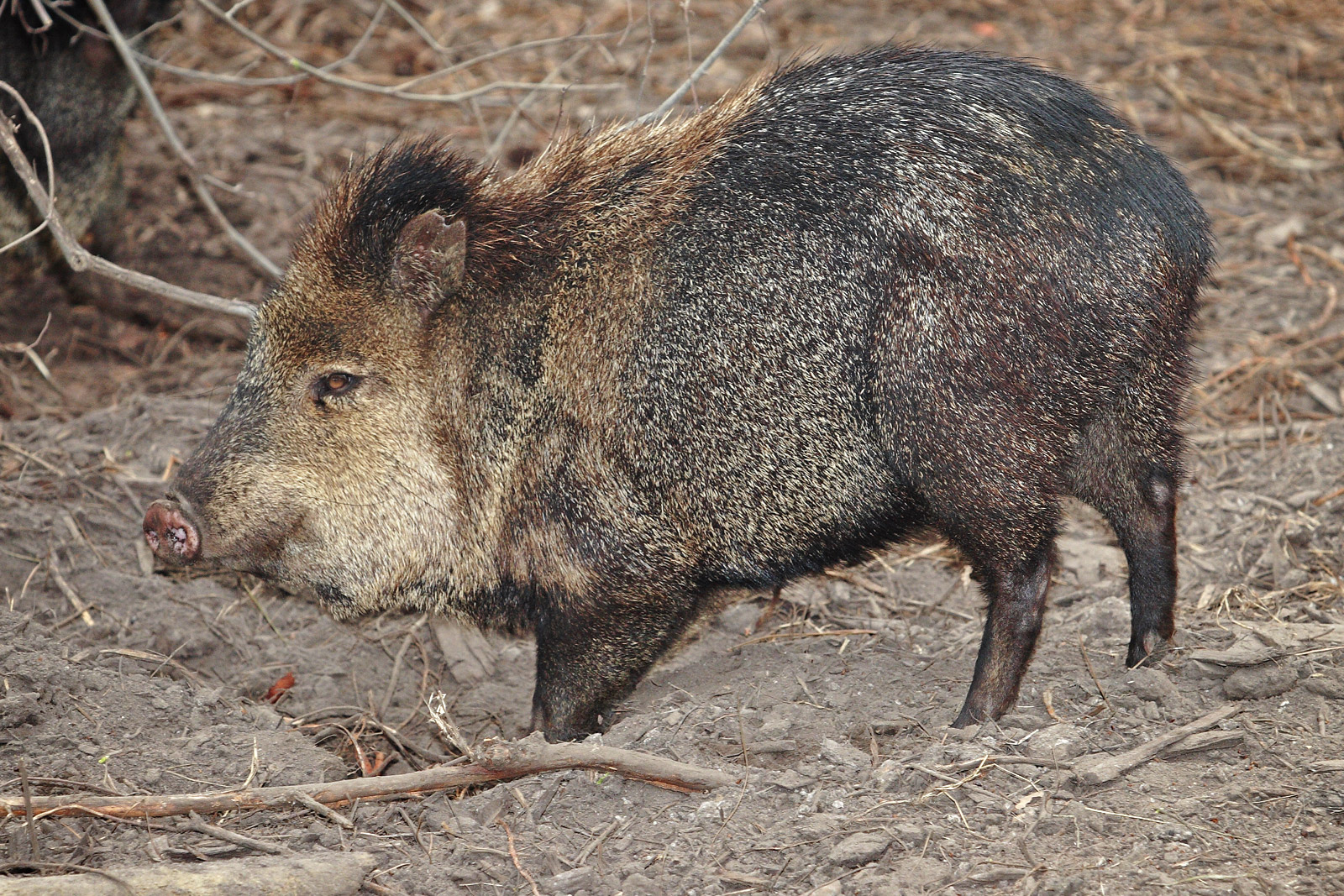
Collared peccary

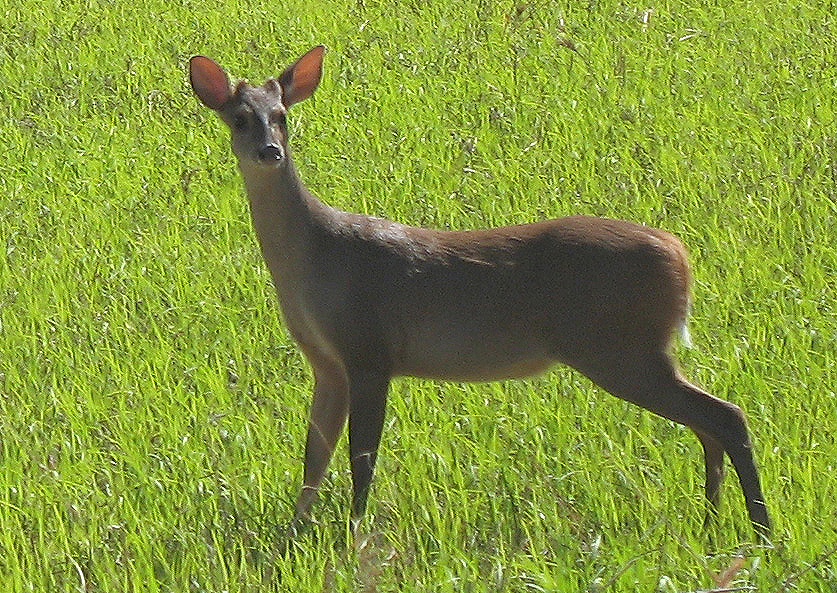
Red brocket

The even-toed ungulates are ungulates whose weight is borne about equally by the third and fourth toes, rather than mostly or entirely by the third as in perissodactyls. There are about 220 artiodactyl species, including many that are of great economic importance to humans.

- Family: Tayassuidae (peccaries)
  - Genus: Dicotyles
    - Collared peccary, D. tajacu LC
  - Genus: Tayassu
    - White-lipped peccary, Tayassu pecari NT
- Family: Cervidae (deer)
  - Subfamily: Capreolinae
    - Genus: Mazama
      - Central American red brocket, Mazama temama DD
    - Genus: Odocoileus
      - White-tailed deer, Odocoileus virginianus LR/lc

== See also ==
- Fauna of Nicaragua
- List of chordate orders
- Lists of mammals by region
- List of prehistoric mammals
- Mammal classification
- List of mammals described in the 2000s
