= Molossus alvarezi =

Alvarez's mastiff bat

Conservation status
- Data Deficient (IUCN 3.1)

Scientific classification
- Kingdom: Animalia
- Phylum: Chordata
- Class: Mammalia
- Infraclass: Placentalia
- Order: Chiroptera
- Family: Molossidae
- Genus: Molossus
- Species: M. alvarezi

Binomial name
- Molossus alvarezi González-Ruiz, Ramírez-Pulido and Arroyo-Cabrales, 2011
- Alvarez's mastiff bat range

Species of bat

Molossus alvarezi, or Alvarez's mastiff bat, is a species of bat in the family Molossidae, native to the Yucatán Peninsula. It lives within a relative homogenous environment within perennial forests, low forests, and a band of xeric vegetation.

== Taxonomy ==
Molossus alvarezi was described as a new species in 2011. The authors examined specimens of the Sinaloan mastiff bat (M. sinaloae) and found that individuals in the Yucatán Peninsula were morphologically distinct from other regions. The genus name Molossus refers to the ancient Molossus breed of shepherd dog, while the specific name alvarezi honors the late José Ticul Álvarez Solórzano for his significant contributions to the development of Mexican mammalogy.

In a 2019 study that examined the genetics of some Molossus species, the authors found that M. alvarezi was the sister taxon of Molossus fentoni.

== Description ==
Molossus alvarezi is physically similar to Molossus sinaloae, though smaller in most dimensions. It is considered medium-sized for a bat of its genus, with a forearm length of 42.7–47.4 mm (1.68–1.87 in). The fur of its back is dark brown, while its underside is paler and grayish brown.

== Range and habitat ==
Molossus alvarezi is found in Mexico in the states of Quintana Roo and Yucatán. Its range also includes Honduras and French Guiana.
