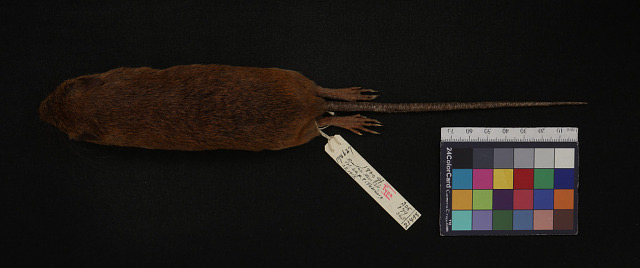

Conservation status
- Least Concern (IUCN 3.1)

Scientific classification
- Kingdom: Animalia
- Phylum: Chordata
- Class: Mammalia
- Order: Rodentia
- Family: Cricetidae
- Subfamily: Sigmodontinae
- Genus: Sigmodontomys
- Species: S. alfari

Binomial name
- Sigmodontomys alfari J.A. Allen, 1897

= Sigmodontomys alfari =

Species of rodent

Sigmodontomys alfari, also known as the short-tailed sigmodontomys, Alfaro's rice water rat, Cana rice rat, or Allen's rice rat, is a species of rodent in the subfamily Sigmodontinae of family Cricetidae. It is found from Honduras through Nicaragua, Costa Rica, and Panama into South America, where it occurs from Venezuela through Colombia to Ecuador.

== Literature cited ==
- Duff, A. and Lawson, A. 2004. Mammals of the World: A checklist. New Haven: A & C Black. ISBN 0-7136-6021-X
- Jones, J.K., Jr. and Engstrom, M.D. 1986. Synopsis of the rice rats (genus Oryzomys) of Nicaragua. Occasional Papers, The Museum, Texas Tech University 103:1–23.
- Musser, G.G. and Carleton, M.D. 2005. Superfamily Muroidea. Pp. 894–1531 in Wilson, D.E. and Reeder, D.M. (eds.). Mammal Species of the World: a taxonomic and geographic reference. 3rd ed. Baltimore: The Johns Hopkins University Press, 2 vols., 2142 pp. ISBN 978-0-8018-8221-0
