= Stirton's deer mouse =

Conservation status
- Least Concern (IUCN 3.1)

Scientific classification
- Kingdom: Animalia
- Phylum: Chordata
- Class: Mammalia
- Infraclass: Placentalia
- Order: Rodentia
- Family: Cricetidae
- Subfamily: Neotominae
- Genus: Peromyscus
- Species: P. stirtoni

Binomial name
- Peromyscus stirtoni Dickey, 1928

Species of rodent

Stirton's deer mouse or Stirton's deermouse (Peromyscus stirtoni) is a species of rodent in the family Cricetidae. It is a species of the genus Peromyscus, a closely related group of New World mice often called "deermice". It is found in El Salvador, Guatemala, Honduras, and Nicaragua. P. stirtoni is widely distributed and is presumed to have a large population and a tolerance of habitat destruction, though its biology is poorly understood. The species is named after Ruben A. Stirton (1901–1966), an American zoologist associated with the University of California at Berkeley.
