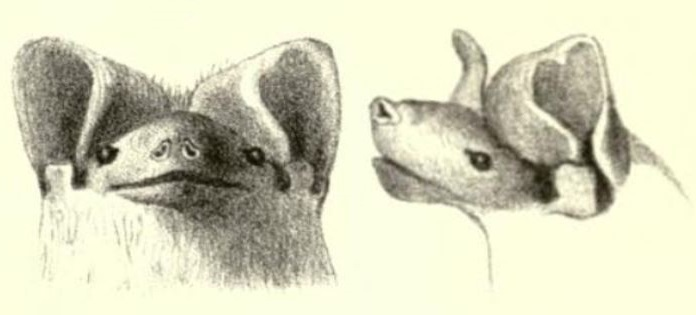

Conservation status
- Least Concern (IUCN 3.1)

Scientific classification
- Kingdom: Animalia
- Phylum: Chordata
- Class: Mammalia
- Order: Chiroptera
- Family: Molossidae
- Genus: Molossus
- Species: M. aztecus

Binomial name
- Molossus aztecus Saussure, 1860
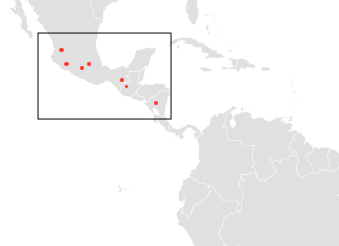
- Aztec mastiff bat range

Synonyms
- Dysopes aztecus Saussure, 1860; Molossus molossus aztecus Saussure, 1860

= Aztec mastiff bat =

Species of bat

The Aztec mastiff bat (Molossus aztecus) is a species of bat in the family Molossidae. It is insectivorous.

== Taxonomy and etymology ==
It was described as a new species in 1860 by Swiss scientist Henri Saussure. Its species name "aztecus" refers to the indigenous Aztecs of Mexico, where this species was first documented.

== Description ==
It is one of the smallest bats of the genus Molossus. Its fur is chocolate brown and its patagia, nose, and ears are very dark brown. Individuals weigh 12–16 g (0.42–0.56 oz). Its forearm length is 34–35 mm (1.3–1.4 in). Its dental formula is 1.1.1.31.1.2.3 for a total of 26 teeth.

== Biology and ecology ==
It is nocturnal, foraging for its insect prey at night and roosting in hollow trees during the day. Unusually for its genus, females may become pregnant while still nursing a pup.

== Range and habitat ==
It is found from Jalisco and Cozumel Island in southern Mexico to Nicaragua and has been reported from Guatemala but not from El Salvador or Honduras. It has also been reported from southern Venezuela. It is endemic to Mexico. It inhabits a variety of forest habitats at elevations from near sea level to 1,300 metres (4,300 ft). It is generally documented at elevations greater than 1,500 m (4,900 ft) above sea level.
