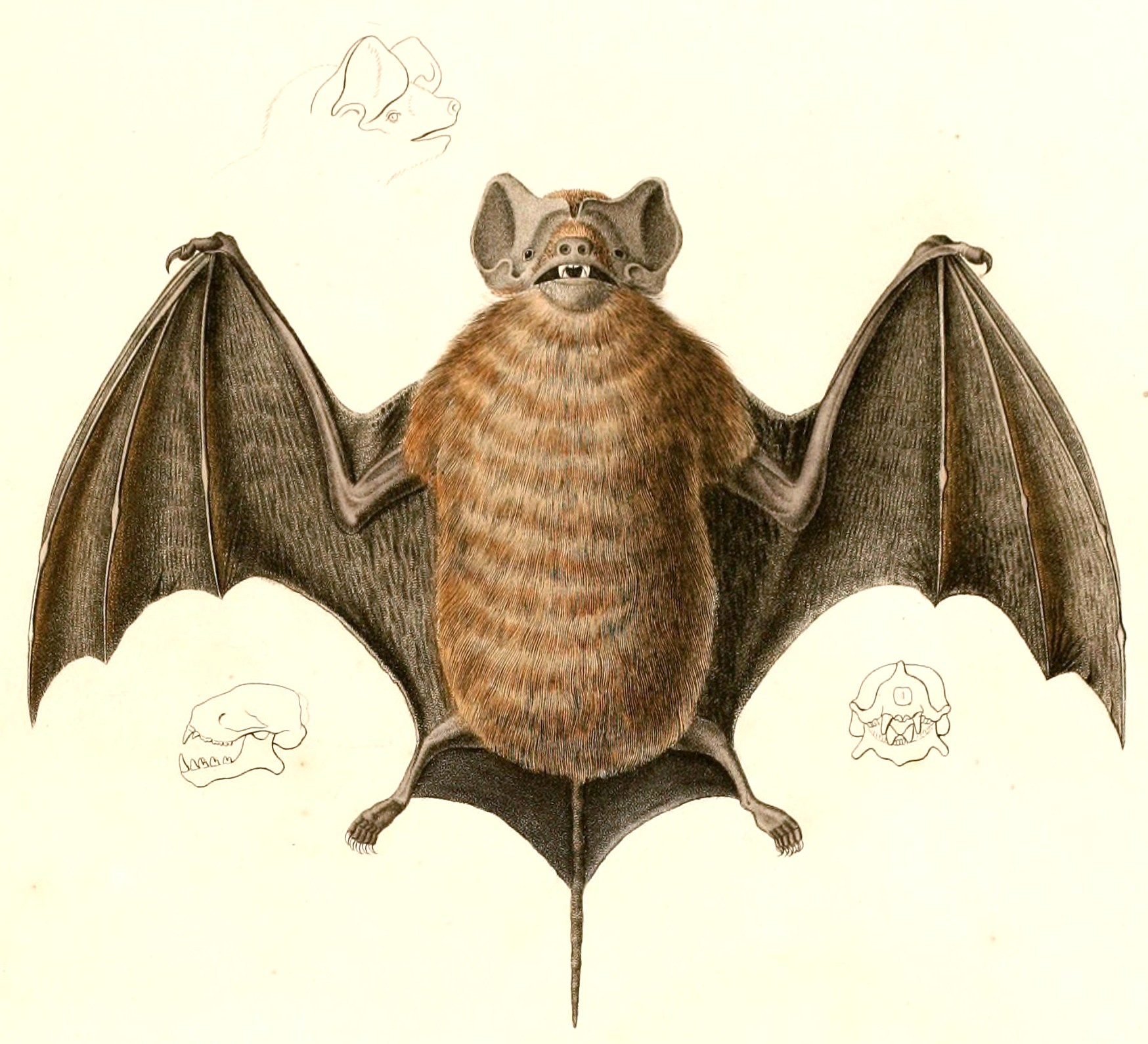
- M. m. molossus

Conservation status
- Least Concern (IUCN 3.1)

Scientific classification
- Kingdom: Animalia
- Phylum: Chordata
- Class: Mammalia
- Order: Chiroptera
- Family: Molossidae
- Genus: Molossus
- Species: M. molossus

Binomial name
- Molossus molossus (Pallas, 1766)
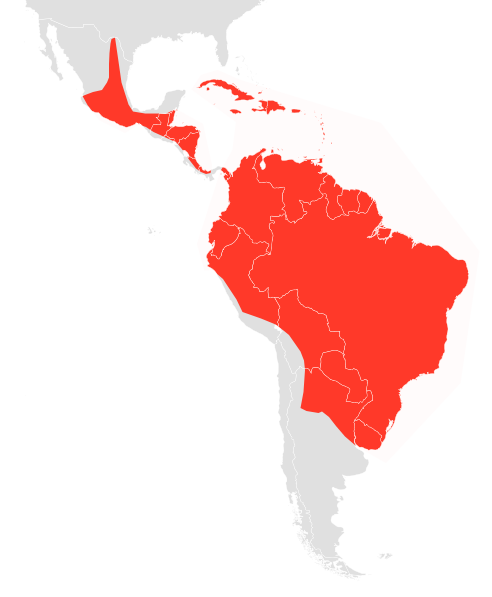
- Velvety free-tailed bat range

= Velvety free-tailed bat =

Species of bat

The velvety free-tailed bat (Molossus molossus) is a species of bat found in North, Central, and South America and the Caribbean.

== Physical description ==
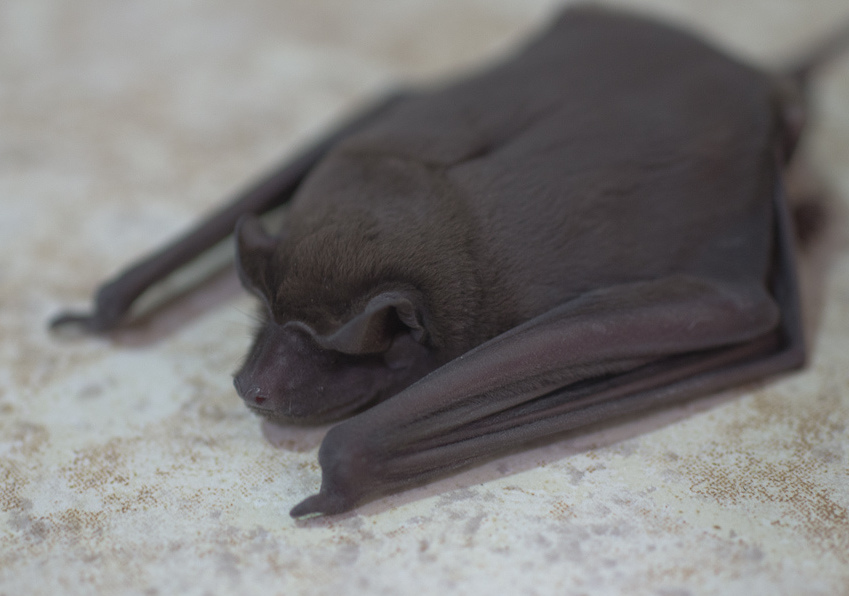
M. molossus

The velvety free-tailed bat is a medium-sized bat, with a length of 4 inches (100 mm) and with a wingspan of 11–13 inches (280–330 mm). This species is brown in color; however, when seen flying around at dusk, it will appear to be black. The tail of the velvety free-tailed bat is long and extends beyond the tail membrane. Its ears are large and round.

== Feeding ==
The velvety free-tailed bat forages in open areas, above tree canopies, around forest edges, and around streams and ponds. Its diet includes moths, beetles, and flying ants. It is commonly seen at dusk, where it will fly solo, catching insects in the air.

== Distribution and habitat ==
It occurs in the Americas from Argentina north to Cuba and Mexico and also the Florida Keys in the United States. It is very common in the Caribbean.

A velvety free-tailed bat has been observed being killed by a giant centipede (Scolopendra viridicornis) in the Amazon. The lone bat had been roosting inside a man-made wooden structure in Cristalino State Park before the centipede grabbed it with its legs and injected venom into its neck. This observation is notable due to the rarity of centipede predation on bats.
