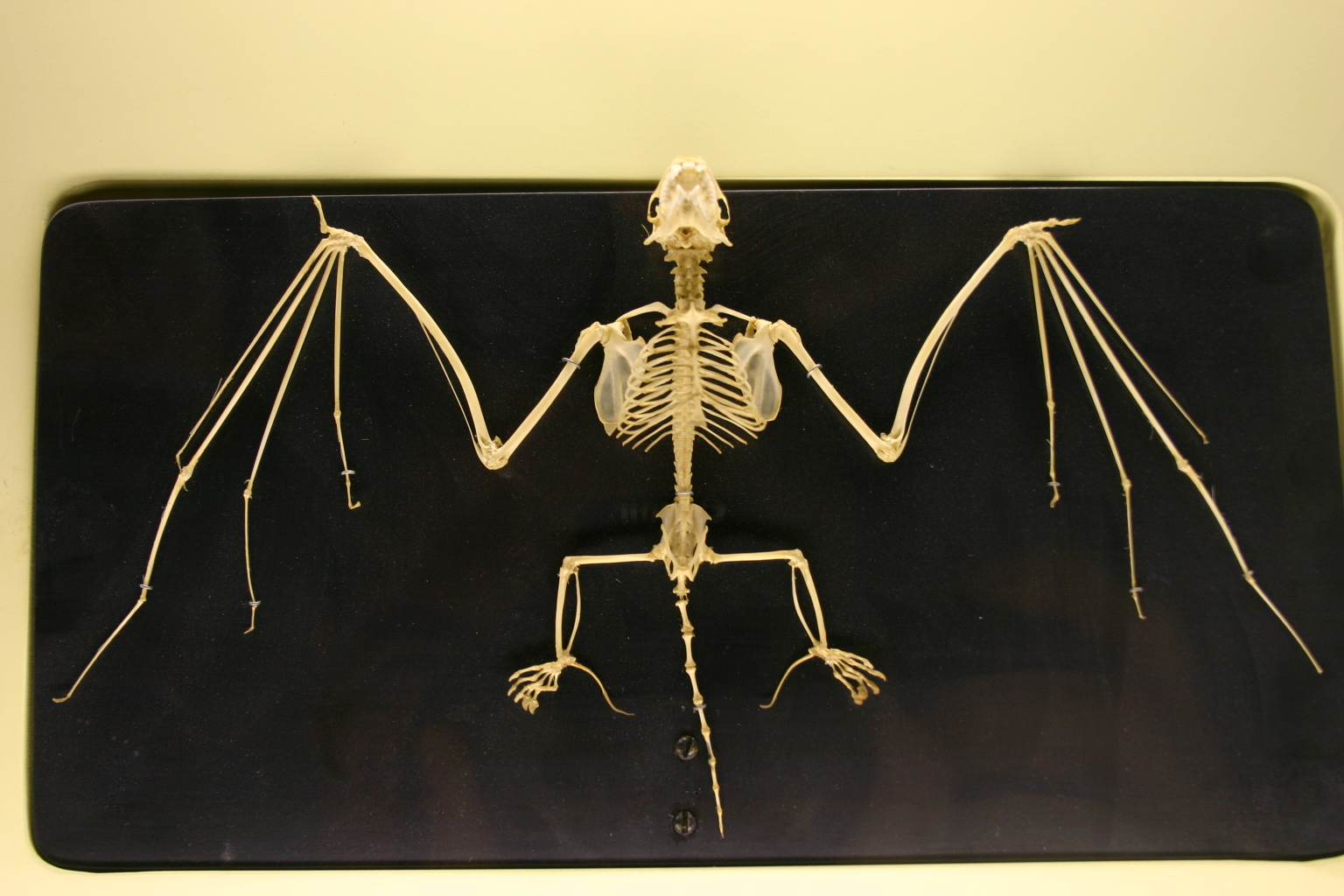
- Molossus nigricans skeleton at the Smithsonian

Scientific classification
- Kingdom: Animalia
- Phylum: Chordata
- Class: Mammalia
- Order: Chiroptera
- Family: Molossidae
- Genus: Molossus; É. Geoffroy, 1805

Type species
- Vespertilio molossus Pallas, 1766

Species
- Molossus alvarezi; Molossus aztecus; Molossus barnesi; Molossus coibensis; Molossus currentium; Molossus molossus; Molossus pretiosus; Molossus rufus; Molossus sinaloae

= Molossus (bat) =

Genus of bats

Molossus is a genus of bats. The genus contains ten species with a New World distribution from Mexico in the north to northern Argentina at its most southerly limit. Four of these species have distributions that include various islands in the West Indies such as Puerto Rico or Trinidad.

The genus belongs to a group commonly referred to as free-tailed bats. Its name is from the ancient Molossus breed of shepherd dog.

== Systematics ==
The following species are recognised:

- Molossus alvarezi
- Molossus aztecus Saussure, 1860
- Molossus bondae
- Molossus coibensis Allen, 1904
- Molossus currentium Thomas, 1901
- Molossus molossus (Pallas, 1766)
- Molossus pretiosus Miller, 1902
- Molossus rufus E. Geoffroy, 1805
- Molossus sinaloae

== Bibliography ==
- "Molossus". Integrated Taxonomic Information System.
