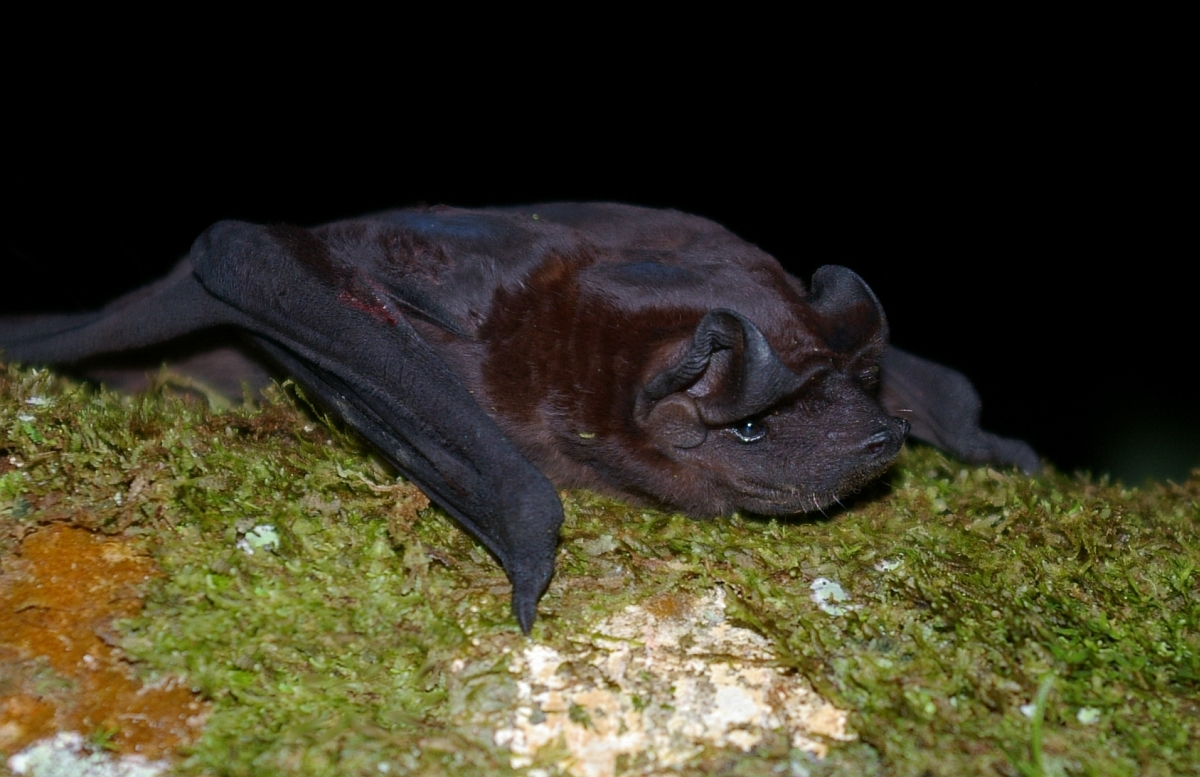

Conservation status
- Least Concern (IUCN 3.1)

Scientific classification
- Kingdom: Animalia
- Phylum: Chordata
- Class: Mammalia
- Order: Chiroptera
- Family: Molossidae
- Genus: Molossus
- Species: M. currentium

Binomial name
- Molossus currentium Thomas, 1900
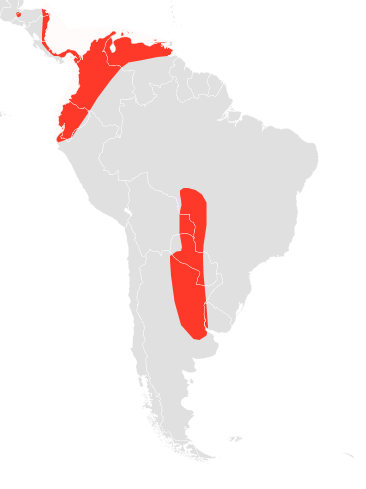
- Bonda mastiff bat range

Synonyms
- Molossus bondae Allen, 1904

= Bonda mastiff bat =

Species of bat

The Bonda mastiff bat or Thomas's mastiff bat (Molossus currentium) is a species of mastiff bat from South and Central America. It is named for the town of Bonda, near Santa Marta in Colombia.

== Description ==
The Bonda mastiff bat is a moderately sized bat, with a total length of about 11 cm (4.3 in) and weighing an average of 18 g (0.63 oz), although males are larger than females. The fur ranges from dull black to reddish orange, with paler underparts, while the wings, muzzle, and ears are black.

== Distribution and habitat ==
The Bonda mastiff bat inhabits two discrete regions. In the north, it is found in eastern Central America from Honduras to Panama, and from northern Venezuela and Colombia, through Ecuador, to extreme northern Peru. In the south, it is found in the Mato Grosso region of Brazil, through Paraguay, into north-eastern Argentina. Within these regions, it primarily inhabits tropical rainforest below about 600 m (2,000 ft) elevation.

== Biology and behaviour ==
Bonda mastiff bats are nocturnal and insectivorous, with moths forming a significant part of their diet. They commonly roost during the day in caves and hollow tree trunks, but have often been found roosting in buildings. Female bats give birth to a single young, with pregnant individuals being noted in both March and August. At least some females may enter oestrus more than once in a given year.
