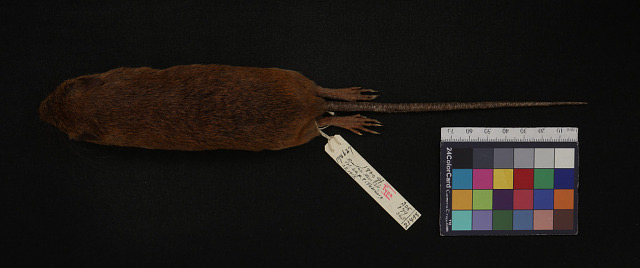
- Sigmodontomys alfari

Scientific classification
- Kingdom: Animalia
- Phylum: Chordata
- Class: Mammalia
- Order: Rodentia
- Family: Cricetidae
- Subfamily: Sigmodontinae
- Tribe: Oryzomyini
- Genus: Sigmodontomys; J.A. Allen, 1897

Species
- Sigmodontomys alfari; Sigmodontomys aphrastus

= Sigmodontomys =

Genus of rodents

Sigmodontomys is a genus of rodent in the tribe Oryzomyini of family Cricetidae. It is related to Nectomys and Melanomys and used to be included in Nectomys. It includes two species, Sigmodontomys alfari and the much rarer Sigmodontomys aphrastus, but whether these are indeed each other's closest relatives is uncertain.

== Literature cited ==
- Musser, G.G. and Carleton, M.D. 2005. Superfamily Muroidea. Pp. 894–1531 in Wilson, D.E. and Reeder, D.M. (eds.). Mammal Species of the World: a taxonomic and geographic reference. 3rd ed. Baltimore: The Johns Hopkins University Press, 2 vols., 2142 pp. ISBN 978-0-8018-8221-0
- Weksler, M. 2006. Phylogenetic relationships of oryzomyine rodents (Muroidea: Sigmodontinae): separate and combined analyses of morphological and molecular data. Bulletin of the American Museum of Natural History 296:1–149.
