= List of mammals of Panama =

This is a list of the mammal species recorded in Panama. Among the mammals in Panama, two are classified as critically endangered, seven are endangered, eleven are vulnerable and three are near threatened. One species is classified as extinct.

The following tags are used to highlight each species' conservation status according to assessment done by the International Union for Conservation of Nature:

| EX | Extinct | No reasonable doubt that the last individual has died. |
| EW | Extinct in the wild | Known only to survive in captivity or as a naturalized populations well outside its previous range. |
| CR | Critically endangered | The species is in imminent risk of extinction in the wild. |
| EN | Endangered | The species is facing an extremely high risk of extinction in the wild. |
| VU | Vulnerable | The species is facing a high risk of extinction in the wild. |
| NT | Near threatened | The species does not meet any of the criteria that would categorise it as risking extinction but it is likely to do so in the future. |
| LC | Least concern | There are no current identifiable risks to the species. |
| DD | Data deficient | There is inadequate information to make an assessment of the risks to this species. |

In the table below, the species were assessed by using an older set of criteria. Species assessed using this system are classified as the following instead of near threatened and least concern categories:

| LR/cd | Lower risk/conservation dependent | Species which were the focus of conservation programmes and may have moved into a higher risk category if that programme was discontinued. |
| LR/nt | Lower risk/near threatened | Species which are close to being classified as vulnerable but are not the subject of conservation programmes. |
| LR/lc | Lower risk/least concern | Species for which there are no identifiable risks. |

== Subclass: Theria ==
=== Infraclass: Metatheria ===
==== Order: Didelphimorphia (common opossums) ====
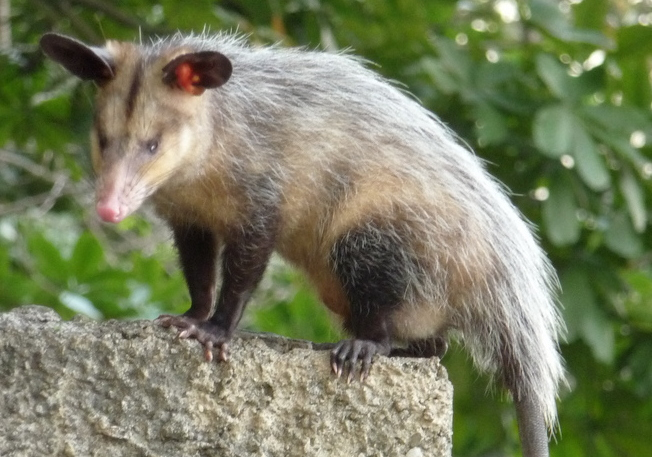
Common opossum

Didelphimorphia is the order of common opossums of the Western Hemisphere. Opossums probably diverged from the basic South American marsupials in the late Cretaceous or early Paleocene. They are small to medium-sized marsupials, about the size of a large house cat, with a long snout and prehensile tail.

- Family: Didelphidae (American opossums)
  - Subfamily: Caluromyinae
    - Genus: Caluromys
      - Derby's woolly opossum, C. derbianus LC
  - Subfamily: Didelphinae
    - Genus: Chironectes
      - Water opossum, Chironectes minimus LR/nt
    - Genus: Didelphis
      - Common opossum, Didelphis marsupialis LR/lc
    - Genus: Marmosa
      - Alston's mouse opossum, Marmosa alstoni LR/nt
      - Isthmian mouse opossum, Marmosa isthmica
      - Mexican mouse opossum, Marmosa mexicana LR/lc
      - Robinson's mouse opossum, Marmosa robinsoni LR/lc
    - Genus: Marmosops
      - Panama slender opossum, Marmosops invictus LR/nt
    - Genus: Metachirus
      - Brown four-eyed opossum, Metachirus nudicaudatus LR/lc
    - Genus: Monodelphis
      - Sepia short-tailed opossum, Monodelphis adusta LR/lc
    - Genus: Philander
      - Gray four-eyed opossum, Philander opossum LR/lc

=== Infraclass: Eutheria ===
==== Order: Sirenia (manatees and dugongs) ====
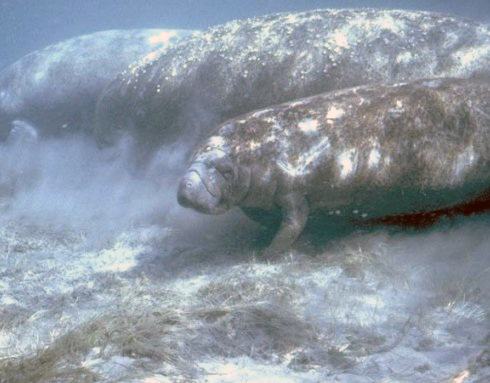
West Indian manatee

Sirenia is an order of fully aquatic, herbivorous mammals that inhabit rivers, estuaries, coastal marine waters, swamps, and marine wetlands. All four species are endangered.

- Family: Trichechidae
  - Genus: Trichechus
    - West Indian manatee, T. manatus VU

==== Order: Cingulata (armadillos) ====
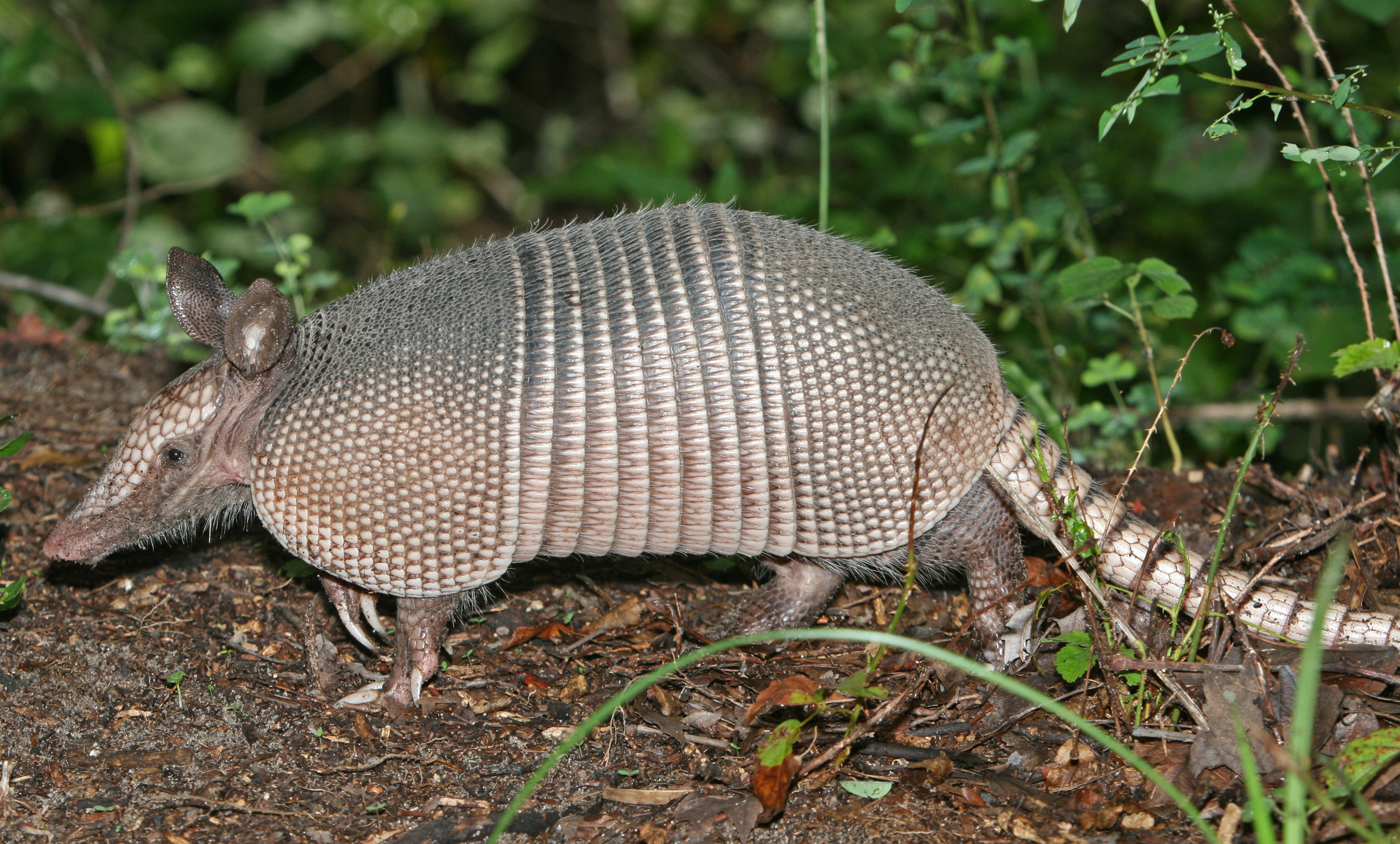
Nine-banded armadillo

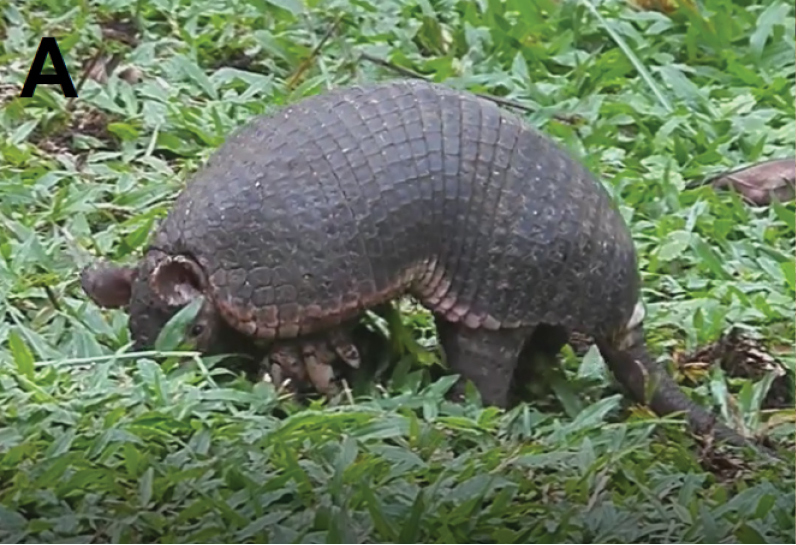
Northern naked-tailed armadillo

Armadillos are small mammals with a bony armored shell. Two of twenty-one extant species are still present in Panama; the remainder are only found in South America, where they originated. Their much larger relatives, the pampatheres and glyptodonts, once lived in North and South America but went extinct following the appearance of humans.

- Family: Dasypodidae (long-nosed armadillos)
  - Subfamily: Dasypodinae
    - Genus: Dasypus
      - Nine-banded armadillo, D. novemcinctus LC
- Family: Chlamyphoridae (armadillos)
  - Subfamily: Tolypeutinae
    - Genus: Cabassous
      - Northern naked-tailed armadillo, C. centralis DD

==== Order: Pilosa (anteaters, sloths and tamanduas) ====
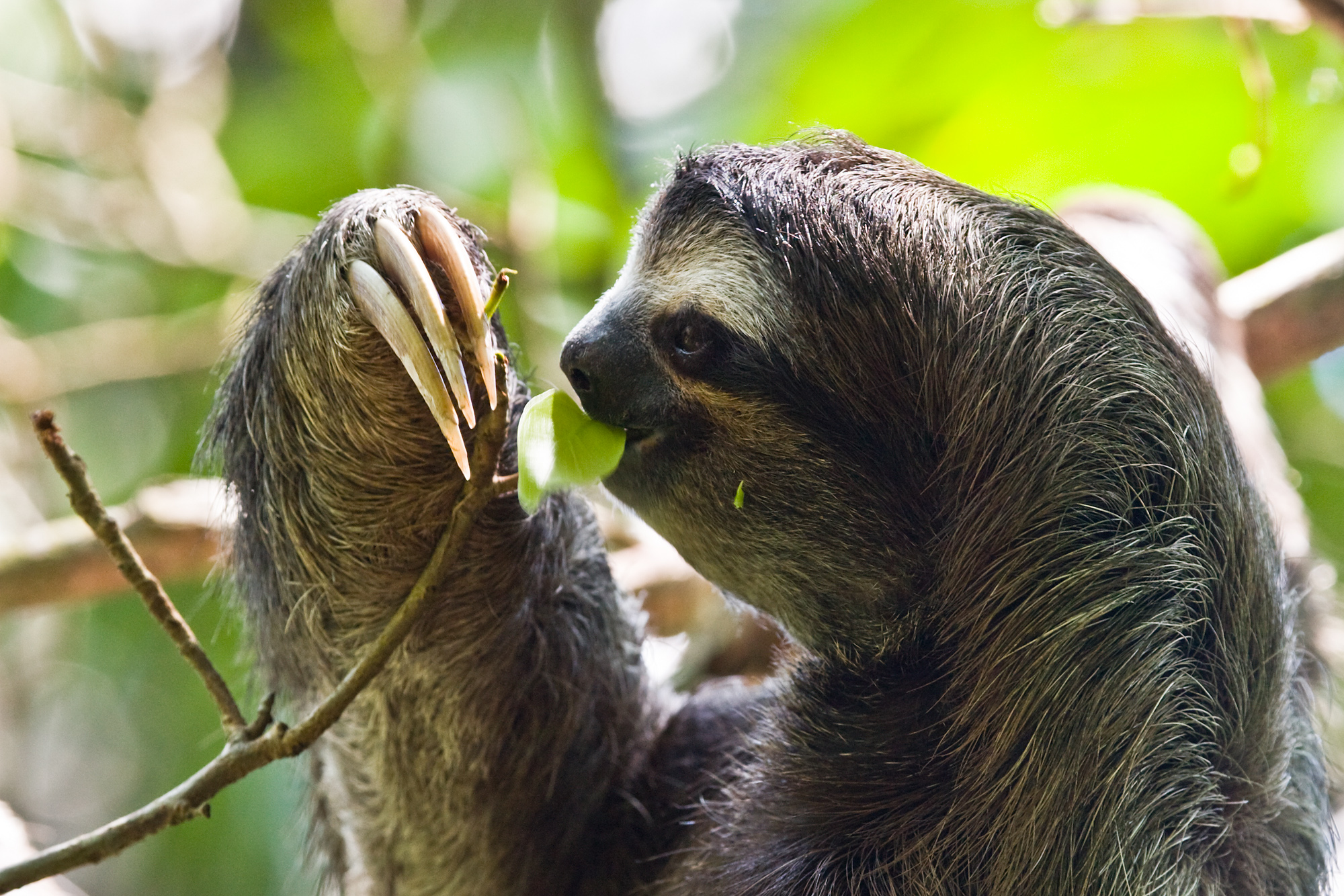
Brown-throated three-toed sloth

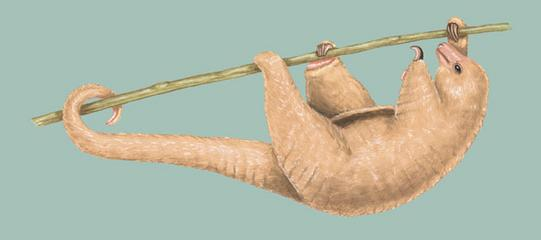
Silky anteater

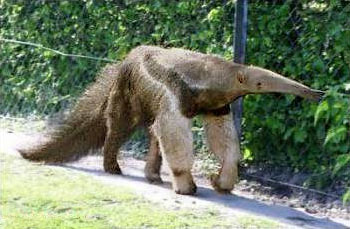
Giant anteater

The order Pilosa is extant only in the Americas and includes the anteaters, sloths, and tamanduas.

- Suborder: Folivora
  - Family: Bradypodidae (three-toed sloths)
    - Genus: Bradypus
      - Pygmy three-toed sloth, B. pygmaeus CR
      - Brown-throated three-toed sloth, B. variegatus LC
  - Family: Choloepodidae (two-toed sloths)
    - Genus: Choloepus
      - Hoffmann's two-toed sloth, C. hoffmanni LC
- Suborder: Vermilingua
  - Family: Cyclopedidae
    - Genus: Cyclopes
      - Silky anteater, C. didactylus LC
      - Central American silky anteater, C. dorsalis NE
  - Family: Myrmecophagidae (American anteaters)
    - Genus: Myrmecophaga
      - Giant anteater, M. tridactyla VU
    - Genus: Tamandua
      - Northern tamandua, T. mexicana LC

==== Order: Primates ====
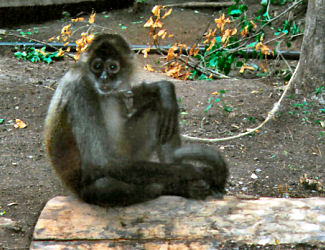
Geoffroy's spider monkey

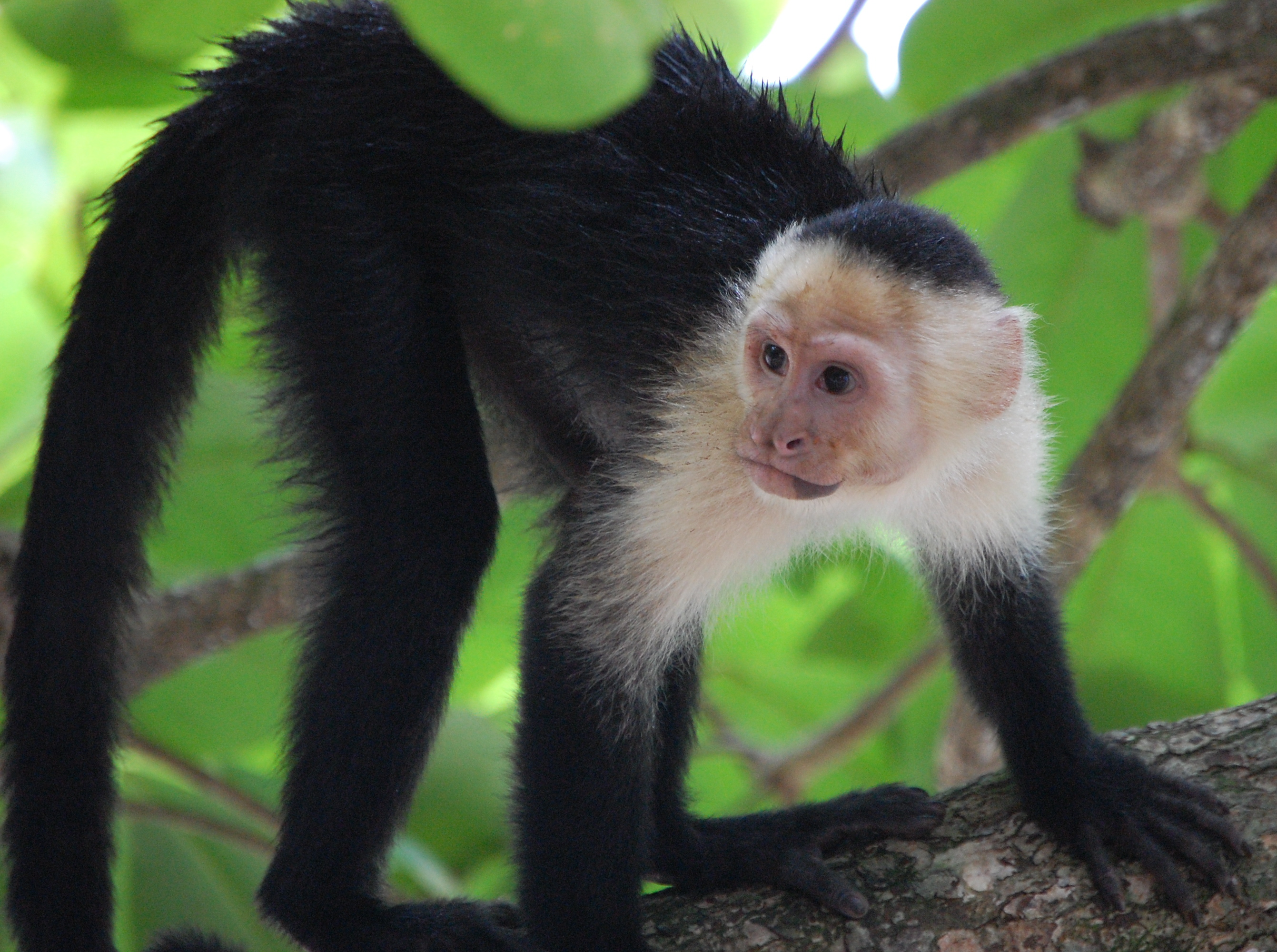
Panamanian white-headed capuchin

The order Primates includes humans and their closest relatives: lemurs, lorisoids, tarsiers, monkeys, and apes. All the non-human Panamanian primates are New World monkeys.

- Suborder: Haplorhini
  - Infraorder: Simiiformes
    - Parvorder: Platyrrhini (New World monkeys)
      - Family: Aotidae
          - Genus: Aotus
            - Panamanian night monkey, Aotus zonalis DD – may be a subspecies of gray-bellied night monkey, Aotus lemurinus VU
      - Family: Cebidae
        - Subfamily: Callitrichinae
          - Genus: Saguinus
            - Geoffroy's tamarin, Saguinus geoffroyi LC
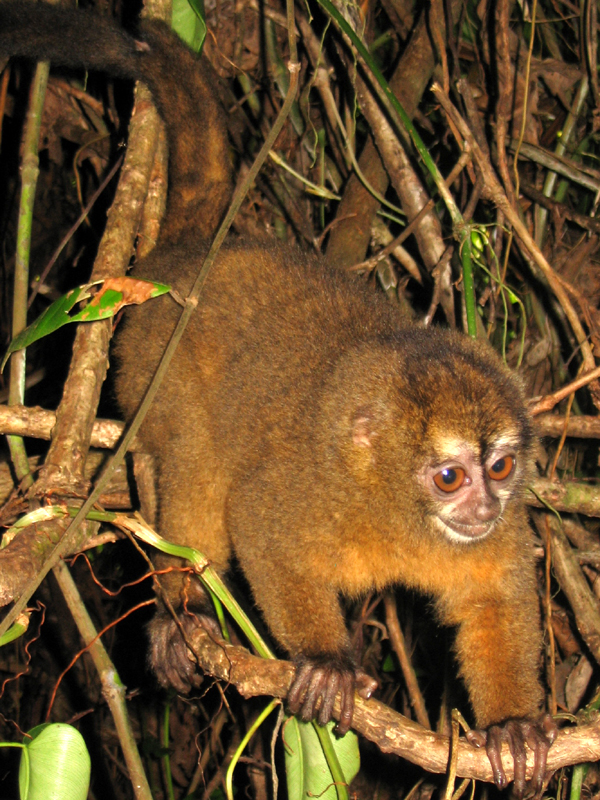
        - Panamanian night monkey
          Subfamily: Cebinae
          - Genus: Cebus
            - Colombian white-faced capuchin, Cebus capucinus LC
            - Panamanian white-faced capuchin, Cebus imitator LC
          - Genus: Saimiri
            - Central American squirrel monkey, Saimiri oerstedii VU
      - Family: Atelidae
        - Subfamily: Alouattinae
          - Genus: Alouatta
            - Mantled howler, Alouatta palliata LC
            - Coiba Island howler, Alouatta coibensis EN
        - Subfamily: Atelinae
          - Genus: Ateles
            - Black-headed spider monkey (Ateles fusciceps) CR
            - Geoffroy's spider monkey, Ateles geoffroyi EN

==== Order: Rodentia (rodents) ====
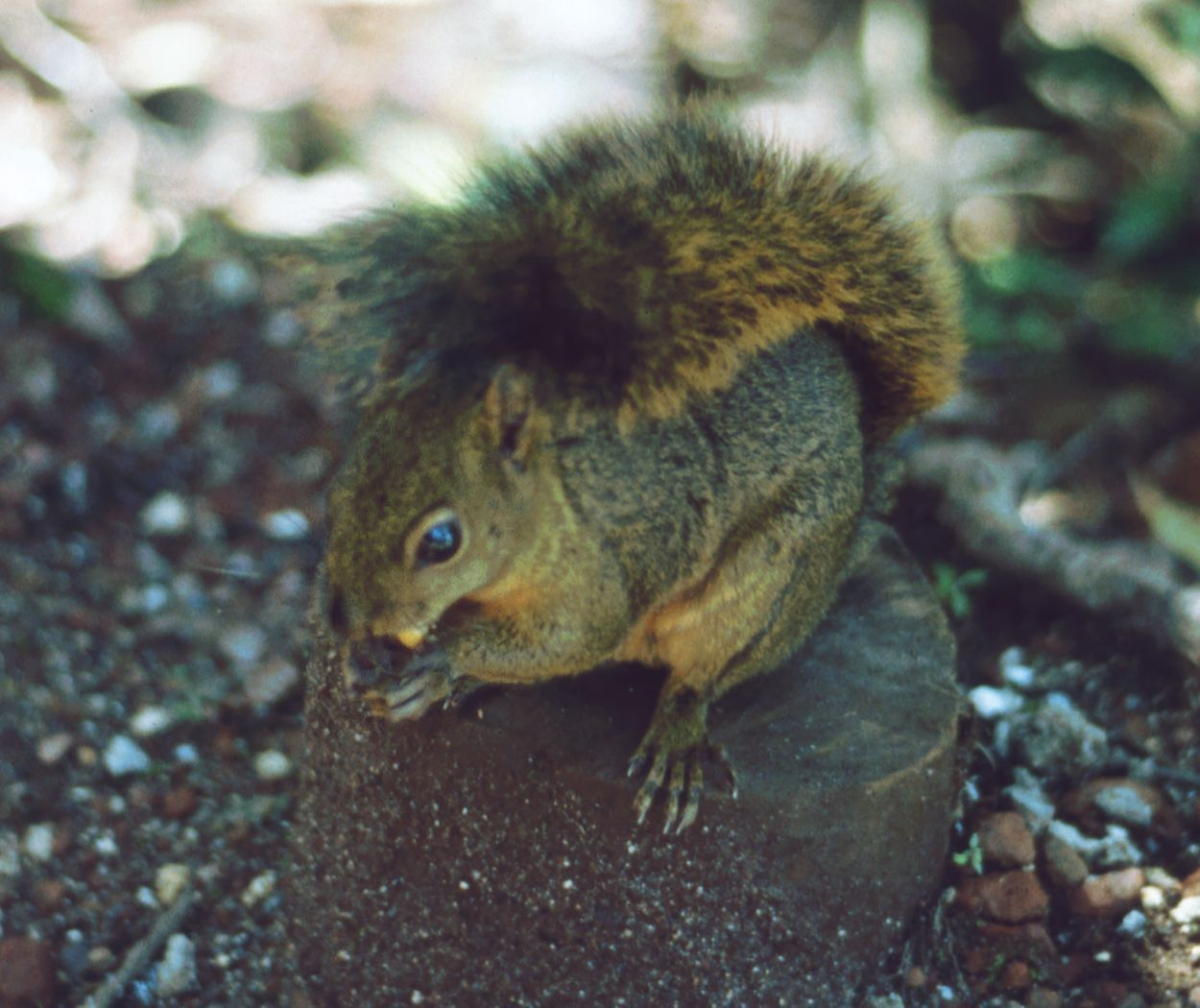
Red-tailed squirrel

Andean porcupine

Lesser capybara

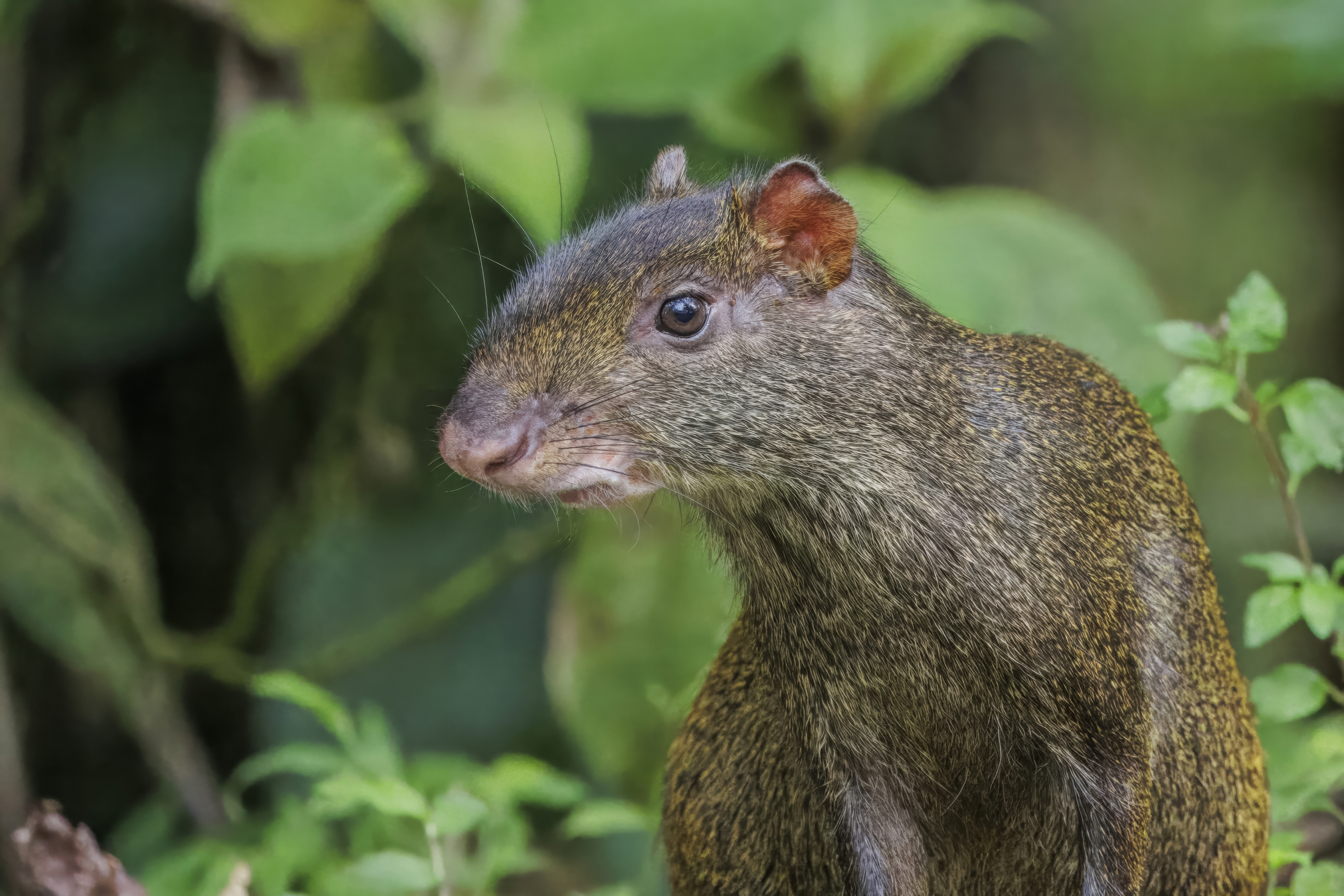
Central American agouti

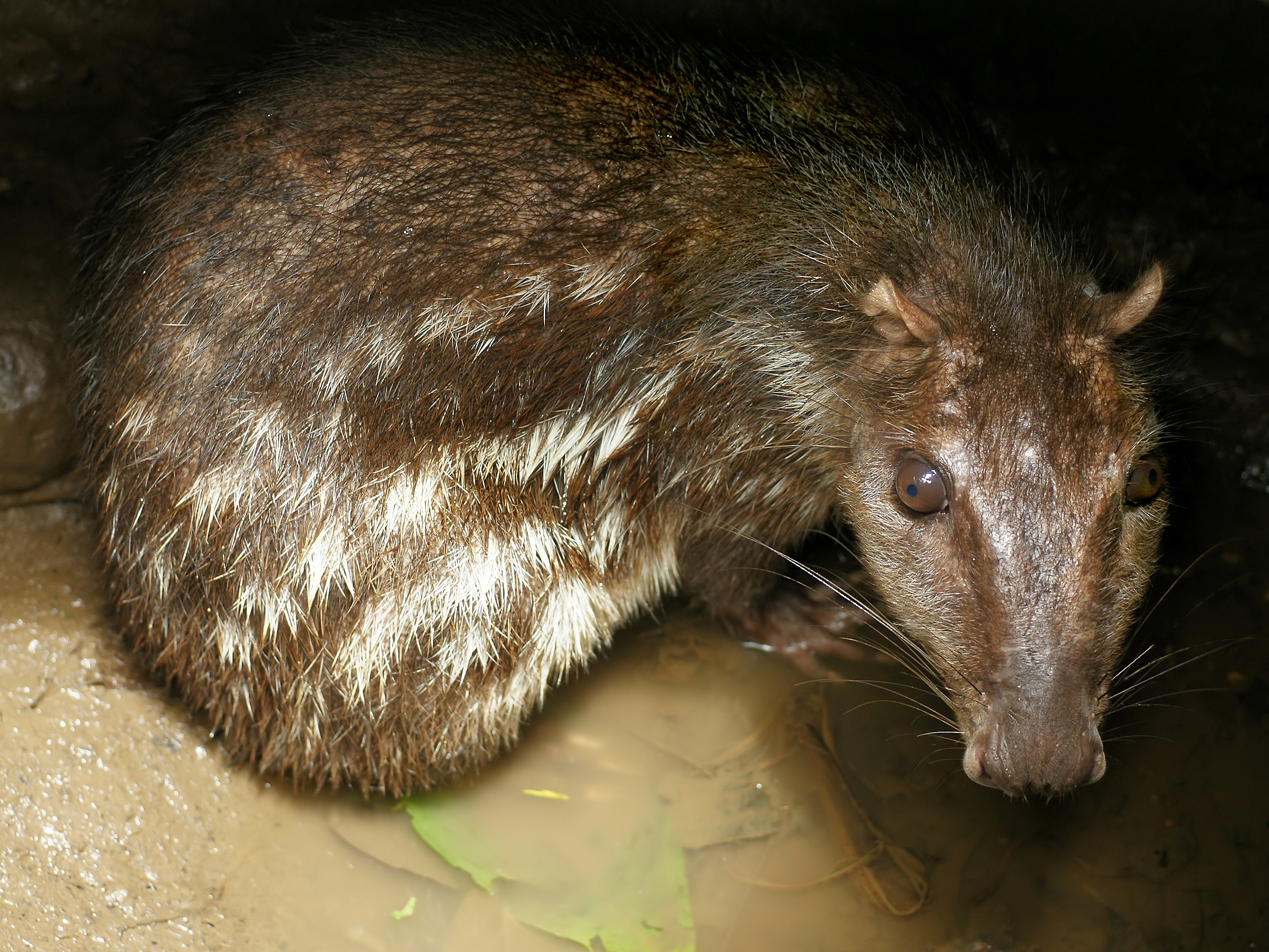
Lowland paca

Rufous soft-furred spiny-rat

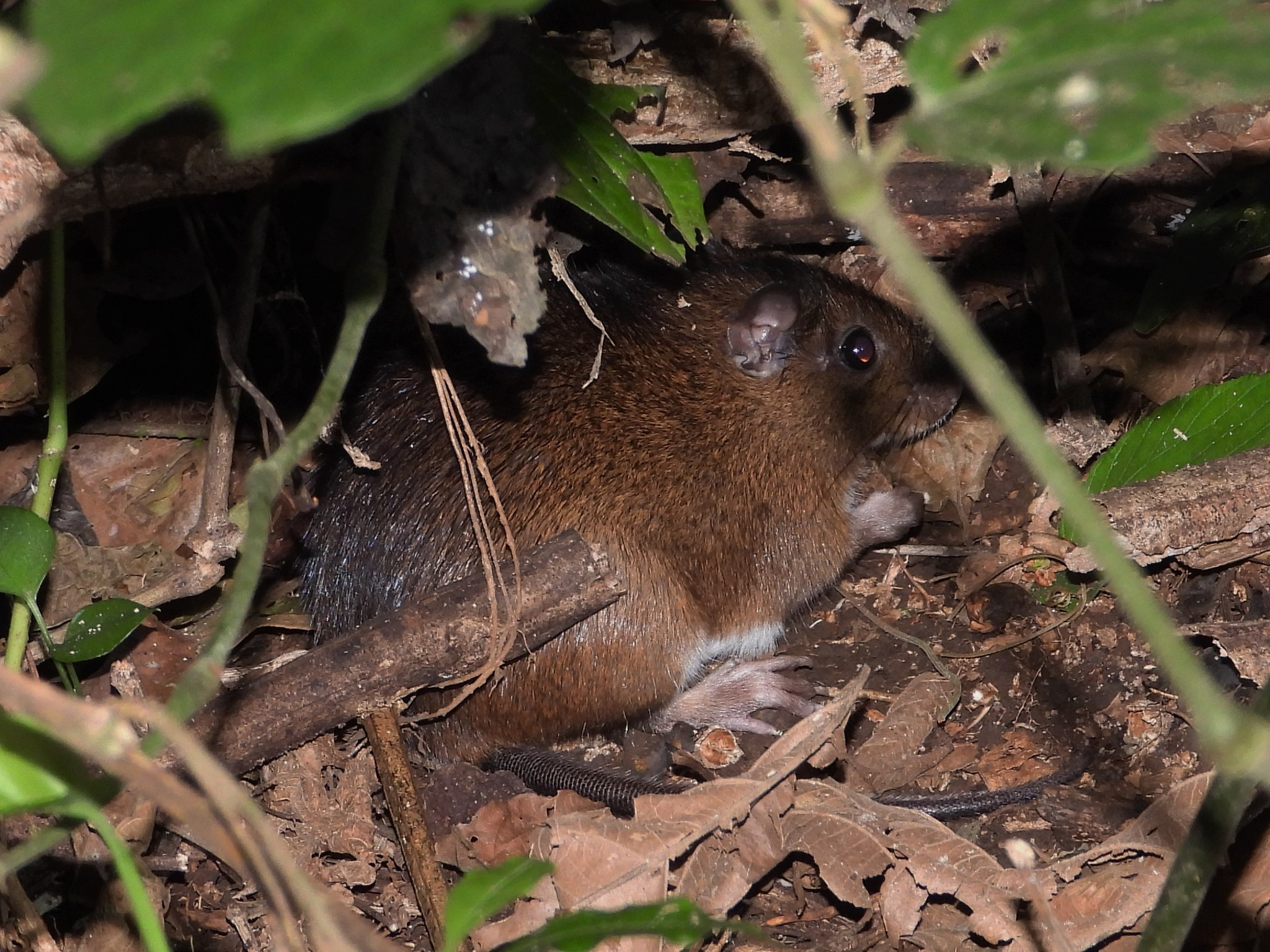
Tome's spiny rat

Southern spiny pocket mouse

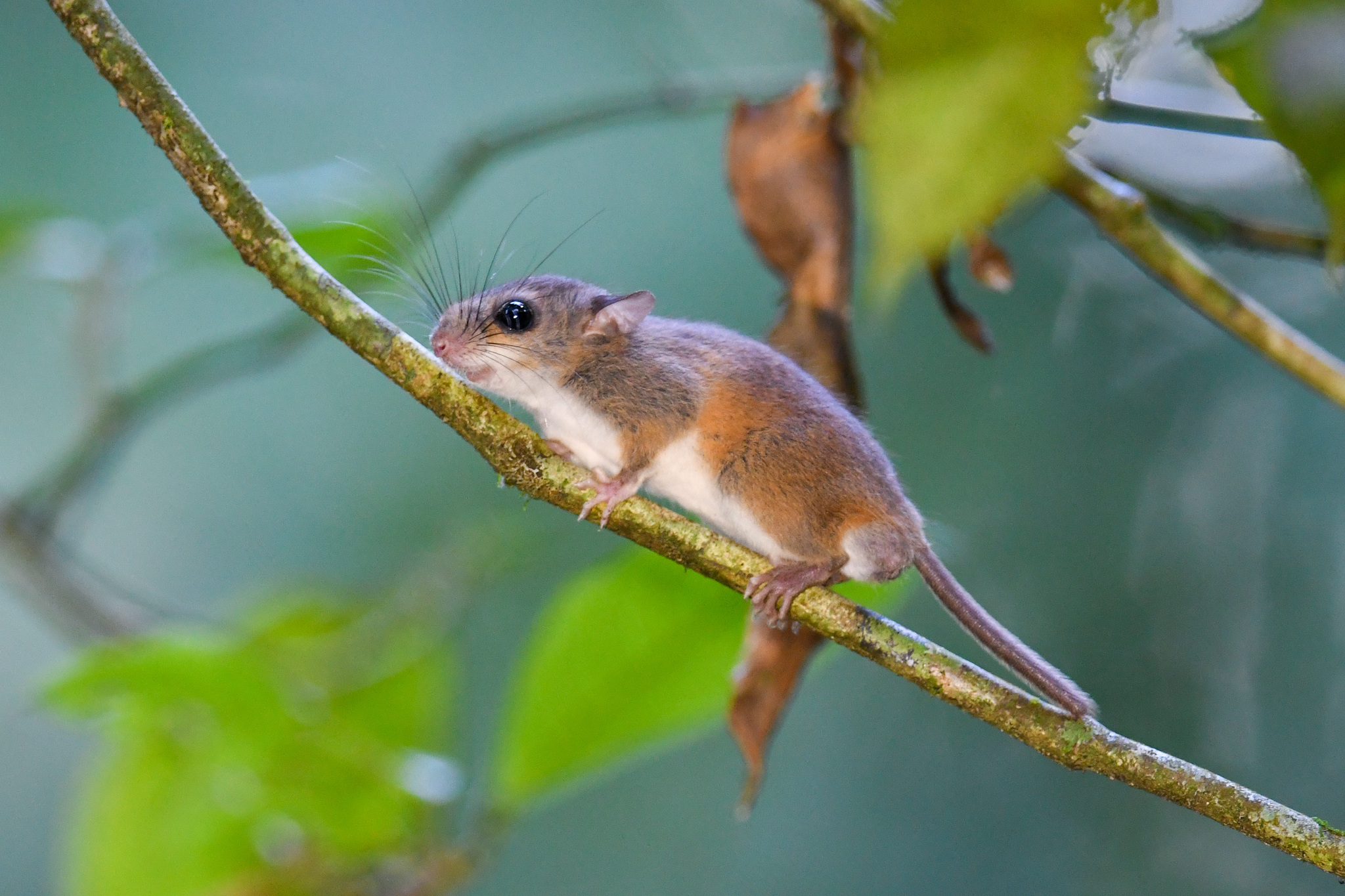
Sumichrast's vesper rat

Rodents make up the largest order of mammals, with over 40% of mammalian species. They have two incisors in the upper and lower jaw which grow continually and must be kept short by gnawing. Most rodents are small unlike the capybara which can weigh up to 45 kg (99 lb).

- Suborder: Hystricognathi
  - Family: Erethizontidae (New World porcupines)
    - Subfamily: Erethizontinae
      - Genus: Coendou
        - Mexican hairy dwarf porcupine, Coendou mexicanus LR/lc
        - Rothschild's porcupine, Coendou rothschildi LR/lc
        - Andean porcupine, Coendou quichua LR/dd
  - Family: Caviidae (guinea pigs)
    - Subfamily: Hydrochoerinae (capybaras and rock cavies)
      - Genus: Hydrochoerus
        - Lesser capybara, Hydrochoerus isthmius LR/dd
  - Family: Dasyproctidae (agoutis and pacas)
    - Genus: Dasyprocta
      - Coiban agouti, Dasyprocta coibae EN
      - Central American agouti, Dasyprocta punctata LR/lc
  - Family: Cuniculidae
    - Genus: Cuniculus
      - Lowland paca, Cuniculus paca LC
  - Family: Echimyidae
    - Subfamily: Echimyinae
      - Genus: Diplomys
        - Rufous soft-furred spiny-rat, Diplomys labilis LR/lc
    - Subfamily: Eumysopinae
      - Genus: Hoplomys
        - Armored rat, Hoplomys gymnurus LR/lc
      - Genus: Proechimys
        - Tome's spiny-rat, Proechimys semispinosus LR/lc
- Suborder: Sciurognathi
  - Family: Sciuridae (squirrels)
    - Subfamily: Sciurinae
      - Tribe: Sciurini
        - Genus: Microsciurus
          - Central American dwarf squirrel, Microsciurus alfari LR/lc
          - Western dwarf squirrel, Microsciurus mimulus LR/lc
        - Genus: Sciurus
          - Red-tailed squirrel, Sciurus granatensis LR/lc
          - Variegated squirrel, Sciurus variegatoides LR/lc
        - Genus: Syntheosciurus
          - Bangs's mountain squirrel, Syntheosciurus brochus LR/nt
  - Family: Geomyidae
    - Genus: Orthogeomys
      - Chiriqui pocket gopher, Orthogeomys cavator LR/lc
      - Darien pocket gopher, Orthogeomys dariensis LR/lc
  - Family: Heteromyidae
    - Subfamily: Heteromyinae
      - Genus: Heteromys
        - Panamanian spiny pocket mouse, Heteromys adspersus LR/nt
        - Southern spiny pocket mouse, Heteromys australis LR/lc
        - Desmarest's spiny pocket mouse, Heteromys desmarestianus LR/lc
  - Family: Cricetidae
    - Subfamily: Tylomyinae
      - Genus: Nyctomys
        - Sumichrast's vesper rat, Nyctomys sumichrasti LR/lc
      - Genus: Tylomys
        - Fulvous-bellied climbing rat, Tylomys fulviventer LR/nt
        - Panamanian climbing rat, Tylomys panamensis VU
        - Watson's climbing rat, Tylomys watsoni LR/lc
    - Subfamily: Neotominae
      - Genus: Isthmomys
        - Yellow isthmus rat, Isthmomys flavidus LR/lc
        - Mount Pirri isthmus rat, Isthmomys pirrensis LR/nt
      - Genus: Peromyscus
        - Mexican deer mouse, Peromyscus mexicanus LR/lc
      - Genus: Reithrodontomys
        - Chiriqui harvest mouse, Reithrodontomys creper LR/lc
        - Darien harvest mouse, Reithrodontomys darienensis LR/lc
        - Mexican harvest mouse, Reithrodontomys mexicanus LR/lc
        - Sumichrast's harvest mouse, Reithrodontomys sumichrasti LR/lc
      - Genus: Scotinomys
        - Alston's brown mouse, Scotinomys teguina LR/lc
        - Chiriqui brown mouse, Scotinomys xerampelinus LR/lc
    - Subfamily: Sigmodontinae
      - Genus: Ichthyomys
        - Tweedy's crab-eating rat, Ichthyomys tweedii LR/lc
      - Genus: Melanomys
        - Dusky rice rat, Melanomys caliginosus LR/lc
      - Genus: Neacomys
        - Painted bristly mouse, Neacomys pictus LR/nt
      - Genus: Oecomys
        - Bicolored arboreal rice rat, Oecomys bicolor LR/lc
        - Trinidad arboreal rice rat, Oecomys trinitatis LR/lc
      - Genus: Oligoryzomys
        - Fulvous pygmy rice rat, Oligoryzomys fulvescens LR/lc
        - Sprightly pygmy rice rat, Oligoryzomys vegetus LR/nt
      - Genus: Oryzomys
        - Tomes's rice rat, Oryzomys albigularis LR/lc
        - Alfaro's rice rat, Oryzomys alfaroi LR/lc
        - Bolivar rice rat, Oryzomys bolivaris LR/lc
        - Coues' rice rat, Oryzomys couesi LR/lc
        - Boquete rice rat, Oryzomys devius LR/lc
        - Talamancan rice rat, Oryzomys talamancae LR/lc
      - Genus: Rheomys
        - Goldman's water mouse, Rheomys raptor LR/lc
        - Underwood's water mouse, Rheomys underwoodi LR/lc
      - Genus: Rhipidomys
        - Broad-footed climbing mouse, Rhipidomys scandens VU
      - Genus: Sigmodon
        - Southern cotton rat, Sigmodon hirsutus LC
      - Genus: Sigmodontomys
        - Alfaro's rice water rat, Sigmodontomys alfari LR/lc
      - Genus: Zygodontomys
        - Short-tailed cane rat, Zygodontomys brevicauda LR/lc

==== Order: Lagomorpha (lagomorphs) ====
Central american tapeti

The lagomorphs comprise two families, Leporidae (hares and rabbits), and Ochotonidae (pikas). Though they can resemble rodents, and were classified as a superfamily in that order until the early 20th century, they have since been considered a separate order. They differ from rodents in a number of physical characteristics, such as having four incisors in the upper jaw rather than two.

- Family: Leporidae (rabbits, hares)
  - Genus: Sylvilagus
    - Dice's cottontail, Sylvilagus dicei VU
    - Eastern cottontail, Sylvilagus floridanus LR/lc
    - Central American tapeti, Sylvilagus gabbi LC
    - Northern tapeti, Sylvilagus incitatus NE

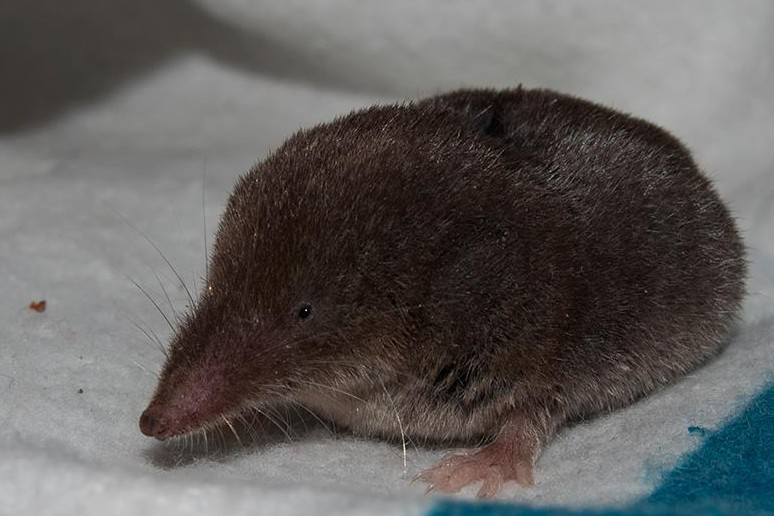
Central American least shrew

==== Order: Eulipotyphla (shrews, hedgehogs, moles, and solenodons) ====
Eulipotyphlans are insectivorous mammals. Shrews and solenodons closely resemble mice, hedgehogs carry spines, while moles are stout-bodied burrowers.

- Family: Soricidae (shrews)
  - Subfamily: Soricinae
    - Tribe: Blarinini
      - Genus: Cryptotis
        - Enders's small-eared shrew, Cryptotis endersi EN
        - Talamancan small-eared shrew, Cryptotis gracilis VU
        - Blackish small-eared shrew, Cryptotis nigrescens LR/lc
        - Central American least shrew, Cryptotis orophilus LR/lc

==== Order: Chiroptera (bats) ====
Greater fishing bat

Big brown bat

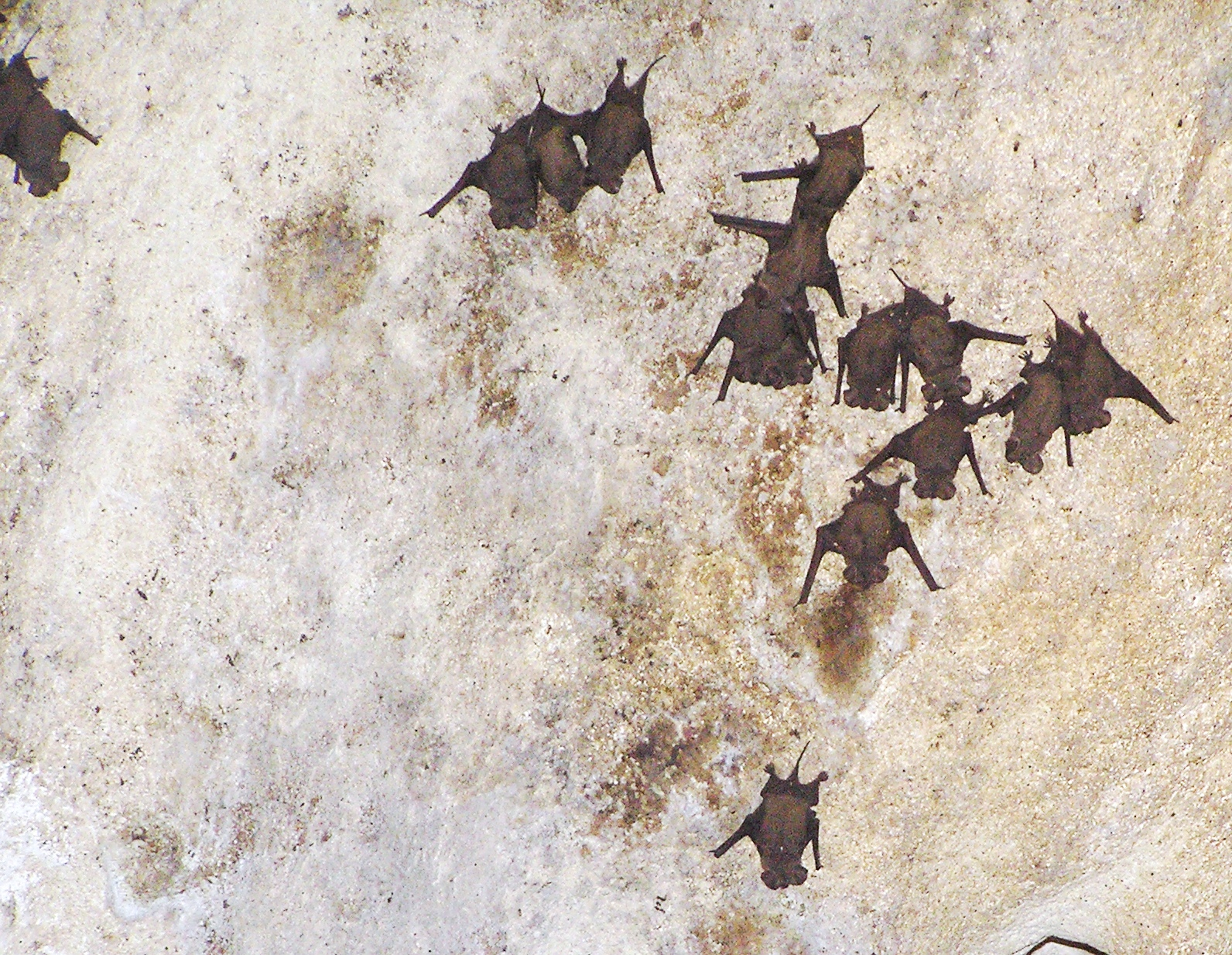
Mexican free-tailed bat

Proboscis bat

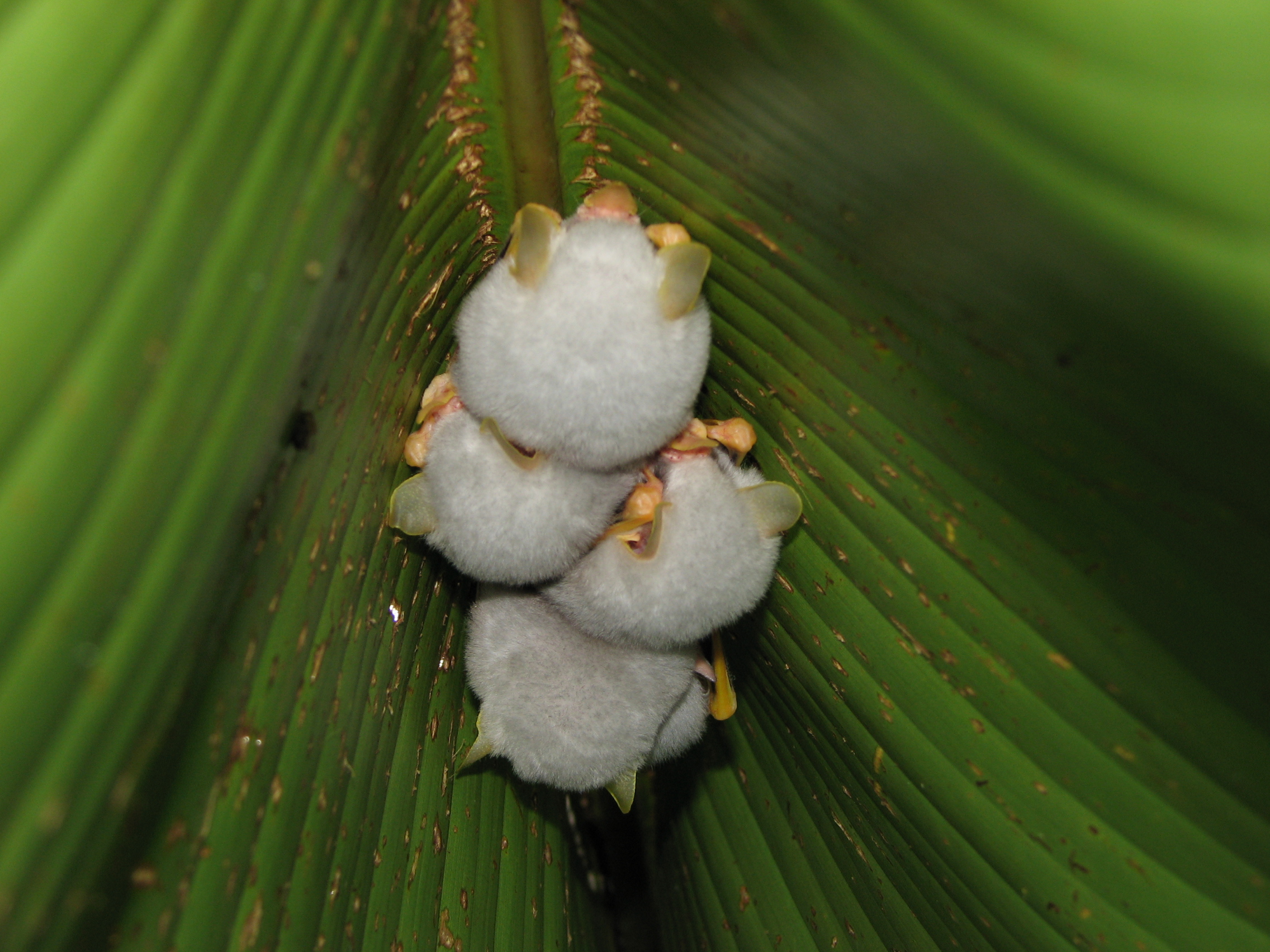
Honduran white bat

Wagner's mustached bat

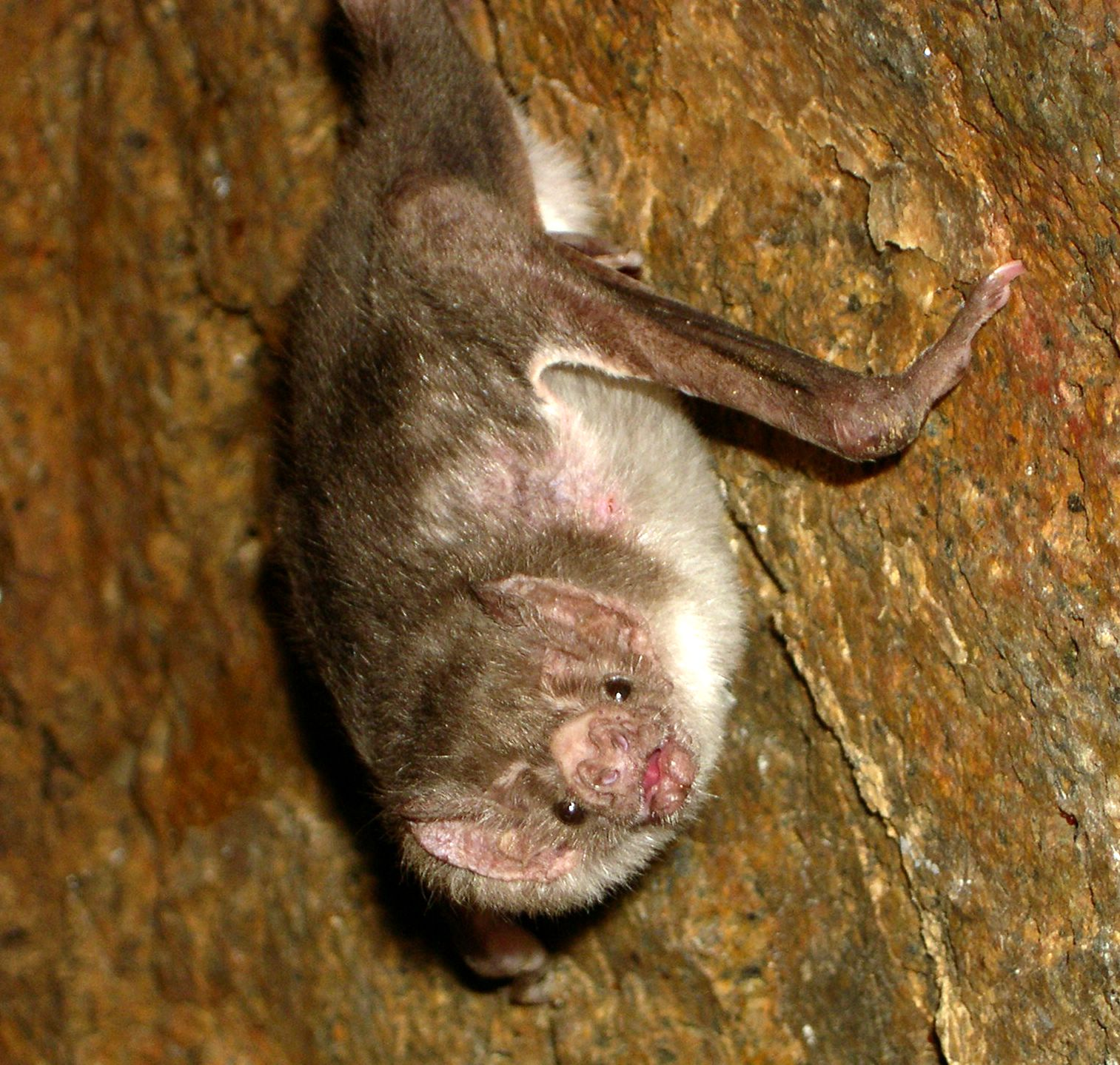
Common vampire bat

Thumbless bat

Peters's disk-winged bat

The bats' most distinguishing feature is that their forelimbs are developed as wings, making them the only mammals capable of flight. Bat species account for about 20% of all mammals.

- Family: Noctilionidae
  - Genus: Noctilio
    - Lesser bulldog bat, Noctilio albiventris LR/lc
    - Greater bulldog bat, Noctilio leporinus LR/lc
- Family: Vespertilionidae
  - Subfamily: Myotinae
    - Genus: Myotis
      - Silver-tipped myotis, Myotis albescens LR/lc
      - Hairy-legged myotis, Myotis keaysi LR/lc
      - Black myotis, Myotis nigricans LR/lc
      - Montane myotis, Myotis oxyotus LR/lc
      - Riparian myotis, Myotis riparius LR/lc
  - Subfamily: Vespertilioninae
    - Genus: Eptesicus
      - Brazilian brown bat, Eptesicus brasiliensis LR/lc
      - Argentine brown bat, Eptesicus furinalis LR/lc
      - Big brown bat, Eptesicus fuscus LR/lc
    - Genus: Lasiurus
      - Desert red bat, Lasiurus blossevillii LR/lc
      - Tacarcuna bat, Lasiurus castaneus VU
      - Southern yellow bat, Lasiurus ega LR/lc
      - Big red bat, Lasiurus egregius LR/nt
- Family: Molossidae
  - Genus: Cynomops
    - Southern dog-faced bat, Cynomops planirostris LR/lc
  - Genus: Eumops
    - Black bonneted bat, Eumops auripendulus LR/lc
    - Dwarf bonneted bat, Eumops bonariensis LR/lc
    - Wagner's bonneted bat, Eumops glaucinus LR/lc
    - Sanborn's bonneted bat, Eumops hansae LR/lc
  - Genus: Molossus
    - Black mastiff bat, Molossus ater LR/lc
    - Bonda mastiff bat, Molossus bondae LR/lc
    - Coiban mastiff bat, Molossus coibensis LR/nt
    - Velvety free-tailed bat, Molossus molossus LR/lc
    - Sinaloan mastiff bat, Molossus sinaloae LR/lc
  - Genus: Nyctinomops
    - Broad-eared bat, Nyctinomops laticaudatus LR/lc
  - Genus: Promops
    - Big crested mastiff bat, Promops centralis LR/lc
  - Genus: Tadarida
    - Mexican free-tailed bat, Tadarida brasiliensis LR/nt
- Family: Emballonuridae
  - Genus: Cormura
    - Wagner's sac-winged bat, Cormura brevirostris LR/lc
  - Genus: Diclidurus
    - Northern ghost bat, Diclidurus albus LR/lc
  - Genus: Peropteryx
    - Lesser doglike bat, Peropteryx macrotis LR/lc
  - Genus: Rhynchonycteris
    - Proboscis bat, Rhynchonycteris naso LR/lc
  - Genus: Saccopteryx
    - Greater sac-winged bat, Saccopteryx bilineata LR/lc
    - Lesser sac-winged bat, Saccopteryx leptura LR/lc
- Family: Mormoopidae
  - Genus: Pteronotus
    - Big naked-backed bat, Pteronotus gymnonotus LR/lc
    - Parnell's mustached bat, Pteronotus parnellii LR/lc
    - Wagner's mustached bat, Pteronotus personatus LR/lc
- Family: Phyllostomidae
  - Subfamily: Phyllostominae
    - Genus: Chrotopterus
      - Big-eared woolly bat, Chrotopterus auritus LR/lc
    - Genus: Glyphonycteris
      - Davies's big-eared bat, Glyphonycteris daviesi LR/nt
      - Tricolored big-eared bat, Glyphonycteris sylvestris LR/nt
    - Genus: Lampronycteris
      - Yellow-throated big-eared bat, Lampronycteris brachyotis LR/lc
    - Genus: Lonchorhina
      - Tomes's sword-nosed bat, Lonchorhina aurita LR/lc
    - Genus: Lophostoma
      - Pygmy round-eared bat, Lophostoma brasiliense LR/lc
      - White-throated round-eared bat, Lophostoma silvicolum LR/lc
    - Genus: Macrophyllum
      - Long-legged bat, Macrophyllum macrophyllum LR/lc
    - Genus: Micronycteris
      - Hairy big-eared bat, Micronycteris hirsuta LR/lc
      - White-bellied big-eared bat, Micronycteris minuta LR/lc
      - Schmidts's big-eared bat, Micronycteris schmidtorum LR/lc
    - Genus: Mimon
      - Striped hairy-nosed bat, Mimon crenulatum LR/lc
    - Genus: Phylloderma
      - Pale-faced bat, Phylloderma stenops LR/lc
    - Genus: Phyllostomus
      - Pale spear-nosed bat, Phyllostomus discolor LR/lc
      - Greater spear-nosed bat, Phyllostomus hastatus LR/lc
    - Genus: Tonatia
      - Stripe-headed round-eared bat, Tonatia saurophila LR/lc
    - Genus: Trachops
      - Fringe-lipped bat, Trachops cirrhosus LR/lc
    - Genus: Trinycteris
      - Niceforo's big-eared bat, Trinycteris nicefori LR/lc
  - Subfamily: Lonchophyllinae
    - Genus: Lionycteris
      - Chestnut long-tongued bat, Lionycteris spurrelli LR/lc
    - Genus: Lonchophylla
      - Godman's nectar bat, Lonchophylla mordax LR/lc
      - Orange nectar bat, Lonchophylla robusta LR/lc
      - Thomas's nectar bat, Lonchophylla thomasi LR/lc
  - Subfamily: Glossophaginae
    - Genus: Anoura
      - Handley's tailless bat, Anoura cultrata LR/lc
      - Geoffroy's tailless bat, Anoura geoffroyi LR/lc
    - Genus: Glossophaga
      - Commissaris's long-tongued bat, Glossophaga commissarisi LR/lc
      - Pallas's long-tongued bat, Glossophaga soricina LR/lc
    - Genus: Hylonycteris
      - Underwood's long-tongued bat, Hylonycteris underwoodi LR/nt
    - Genus: Lichonycteris
      - Dark long-tongued bat, Lichonycteris obscura LR/lc
  - Subfamily: Carolliinae
    - Genus: Carollia
      - Silky short-tailed bat, Carollia brevicauda LR/lc
      - Chestnut short-tailed bat, Carollia castanea LR/lc
      - Seba's short-tailed bat, Carollia perspicillata LR/lc
  - Subfamily: Stenodermatinae
    - Genus: Ametrida
      - Little white-shouldered bat, Ametrida centurio LR/lc
    - Genus: Artibeus
      - Aztec fruit-eating bat, Artibeus aztecus LR/lc
      - Great fruit-eating bat, Artibeus intermedius LR/lc
      - Jamaican fruit bat, Artibeus jamaicensis LR/lc
      - Great fruit-eating bat, Artibeus lituratus LR/lc
      - Pygmy fruit-eating bat, Artibeus phaeotis LR/lc
      - Toltec fruit-eating bat, Artibeus toltecus LR/lc
    - Genus: Centurio
      - Wrinkle-faced bat, Centurio senex LR/lc
    - Genus: Chiroderma
      - Salvin's big-eyed bat, Chiroderma salvini LR/lc
      - Little big-eyed bat, Chiroderma trinitatum LR/lc
      - Hairy big-eyed bat, Chiroderma villosum LR/lc
    - Genus: Ectophylla
      - Honduran white bat, Ectophylla alba LR/nt
    - Genus: Enchisthenes
      - Velvety fruit-eating bat, Enchisthenes hartii LR/lc
    - Genus: Mesophylla
      - MacConnell's bat, Mesophylla macconnelli LR/lc
    - Genus: Sturnira
      - Little yellow-shouldered bat, Sturnira lilium LR/lc
      - Highland yellow-shouldered bat, Sturnira ludovici LR/lc
      - Louis's yellow-shouldered bat, Sturnira luisi LR/lc
      - Talamancan yellow-shouldered bat, Sturnira mordax LR/nt
    - Genus: Uroderma
      - Tent-making bat, Uroderma bilobatum LR/lc
      - Brown tent-making bat, Uroderma magnirostrum LR/lc
    - Genus: Vampyressa
      - Striped yellow-eared bat, Vampyressa nymphaea LR/lc
      - Southern little yellow-eared bat, Vampyressa pusilla LR/lc
    - Genus: Vampyrodes
      - Great stripe-faced bat, Vampyrodes caraccioli LR/lc
    - Genus: Platyrrhinus
      - Thomas's broad-nosed bat, Platyrrhinus dorsalis LR/lc
      - Heller's broad-nosed bat, Platyrrhinus helleri LR/lc
      - Shadowy broad-nosed bat, Platyrrhinus umbratus LR/nt
      - Greater broad-nosed bat, Platyrrhinus vittatus LR/lc
  - Subfamily: Desmodontinae
    - Genus: Desmodus
      - Common vampire bat, Desmodus rotundus LR/lc
    - Genus: Diaemus
      - White-winged vampire bat, Diaemus youngi LR/lc
    - Genus: Diphylla
      - Hairy-legged vampire bat, Diphylla ecaudata LR/nt
- Family: Furipteridae
  - Genus: Furipterus
    - Thumbless bat, Furipterus horrens LR/lc
- Family: Thyropteridae
  - Genus: Thyroptera
    - Peters's disk-winged bat, Thyroptera discifera LR/lc
    - Spix's disk-winged bat, Thyroptera tricolor LR/lc

==== Order: Cetacea (whales) ====
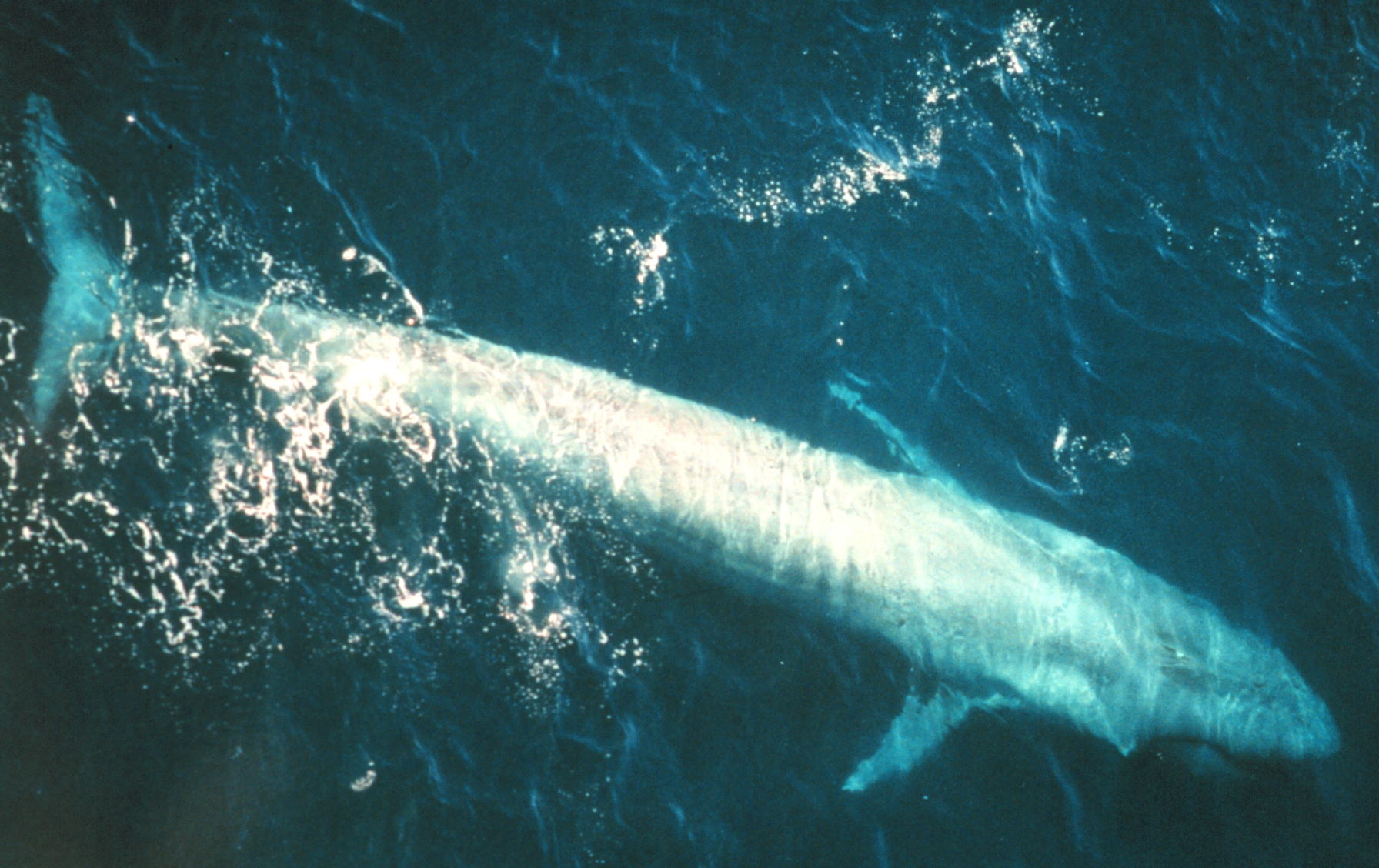
Blue whale

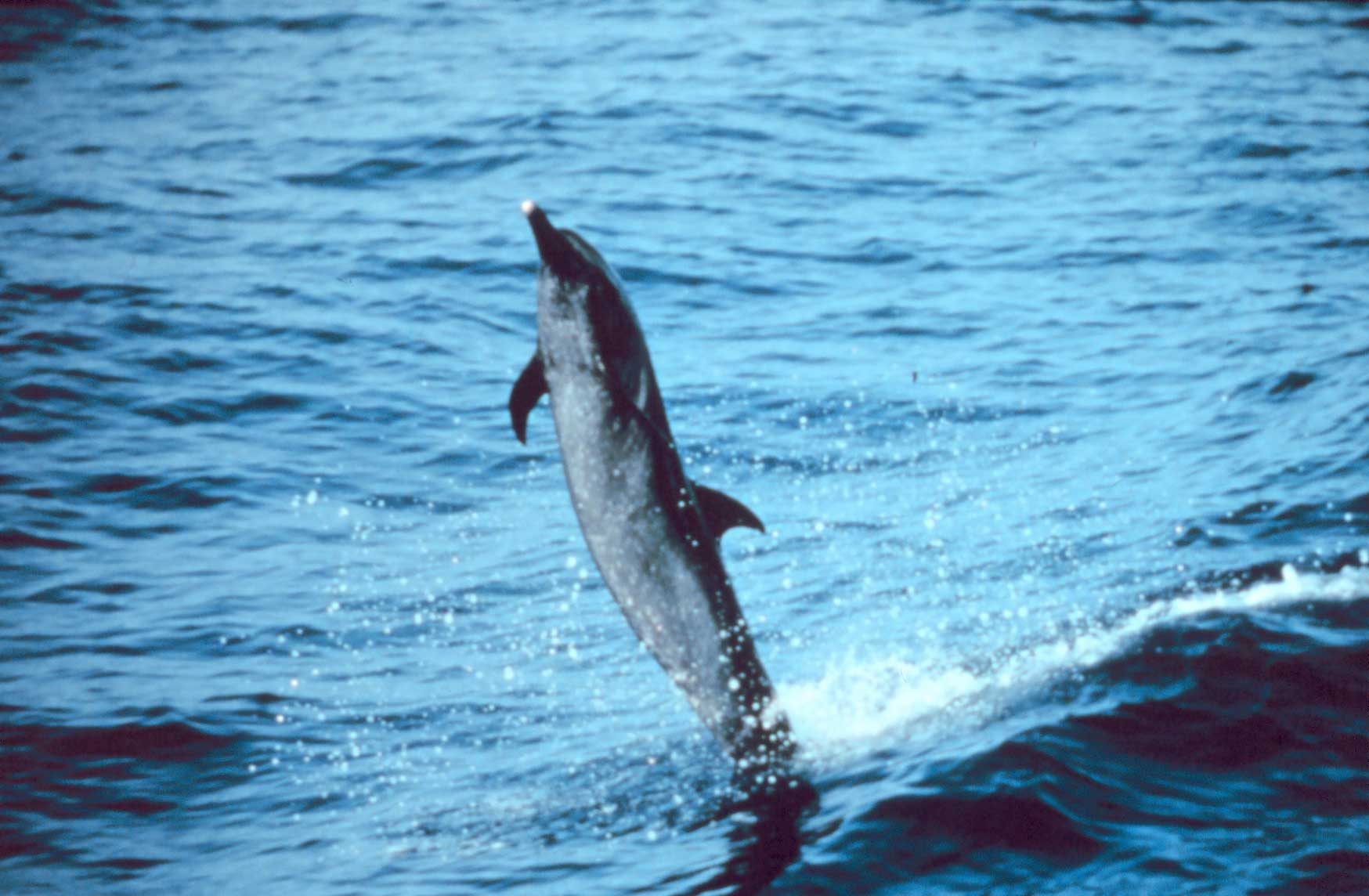
Pantropical spotted dolphin

Killer whales

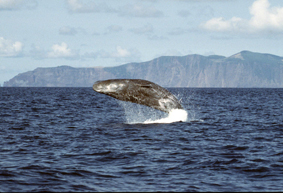
Sperm whale

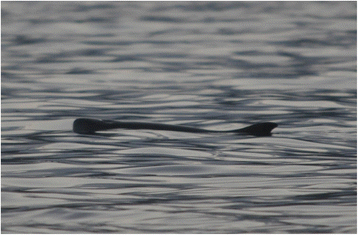
Dwarf sperm whale

The order Cetacea includes whales, dolphins and porpoises. They are the mammals most fully adapted to aquatic life with a spindle-shaped nearly hairless body, protected by a thick layer of blubber, and forelimbs and tail modified to provide propulsion underwater.

- Suborder: Mysticeti
  - Family: Balaenopteridae (baleen whales)
    - Genus: Balaenoptera
      - Common minke whale, Balaenoptera acutorostrata
      - Sei whale, Balaenoptera borealis
      - Bryde's whale, Balaenoptera brydei
      - Blue whale, Balaenoptera musculus
    - Genus: Megaptera
      - Humpback whale, Megaptera novaeangliae
- Suborder: Odontoceti
  - Superfamily: Platanistoidea
    - Family: Delphinidae (marine dolphins)
      - Genus: Delphinus
        - Short-beaked common dolphin, Delphinus delphis DD
      - Genus: Feresa
        - Pygmy killer whale, Feresa attenuata DD
      - Genus: Globicephala
        - Short-finned pilot whale, Globicephala macrorhyncus DD
      - Genus: Lagenodelphis
        - Fraser's dolphin, Lagenodelphis hosei DD
      - Genus: Grampus
        - Risso's dolphin, Grampus griseus DD
      - Genus: Orcinus
        - Killer whale, Orcinus orca DD
      - Genus: Peponocephala
        - Melon-headed whale, Peponocephala electra DD
      - Genus: Pseudorca
        - False killer whale, Pseudorca crassidens DD
      - Genus: Sotalia
        - Guiana dolphin, Sotalia guianensis DD
      - Genus: Stenella
        - Pantropical spotted dolphin, Stenella attenuata DD
        - Clymene dolphin, Stenella clymene DD
        - Striped dolphin, Stenella coeruleoalba DD
        - Atlantic spotted dolphin, Stenella frontalis DD
        - Spinner dolphin, Stenella longirostris DD
      - Genus: Steno
        - Rough-toothed dolphin, Steno bredanensis DD
      - Genus: Tursiops
        - Common bottlenose dolphin, Tursiops truncatus
    - Family: Physeteridae (sperm whales)
      - Genus: Physeter
        - Sperm whale, Physeter catodon DD
    - Family: Kogiidae (dwarf sperm whales)
      - Genus: Kogia
        - Pygmy sperm whale, Kogia breviceps DD
        - Dwarf sperm whale, Kogia sima DD
  - Superfamily Ziphioidea
    - Family: Ziphidae (beaked whales)
      - Genus: Mesoplodon
        - Gervais' beaked whale, Mesoplodon europaeus DD
        - Ginkgo-toothed beaked whale, Mesoplodon ginkgodens DD
        - Pygmy beaked whale, Mesoplodon peruvianus DD
      - Genus: Ziphius
        - Cuvier's beaked whale, Ziphius cavirostris DD

==== Order: Carnivora (carnivorans) ====
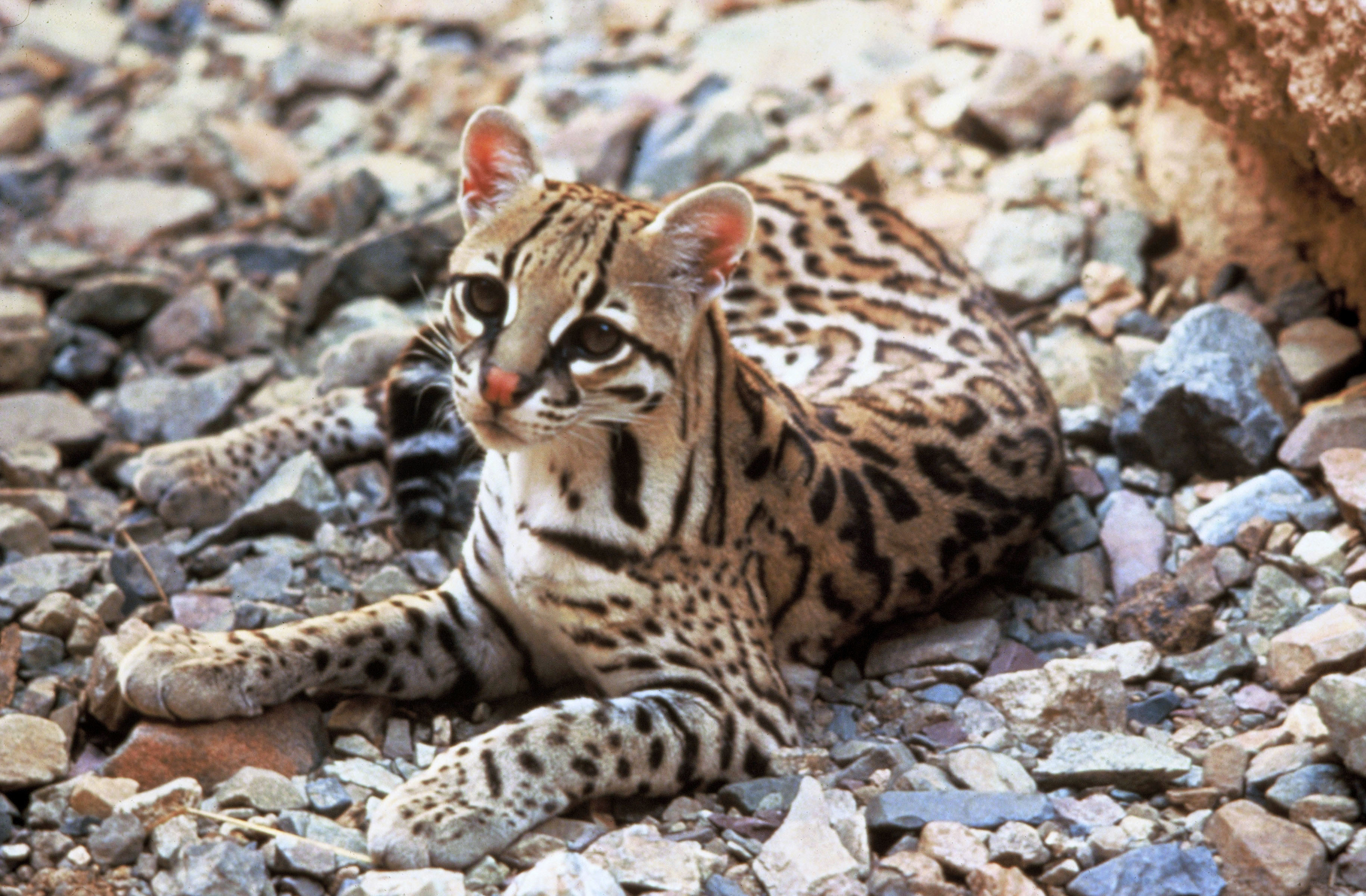
Ocelot

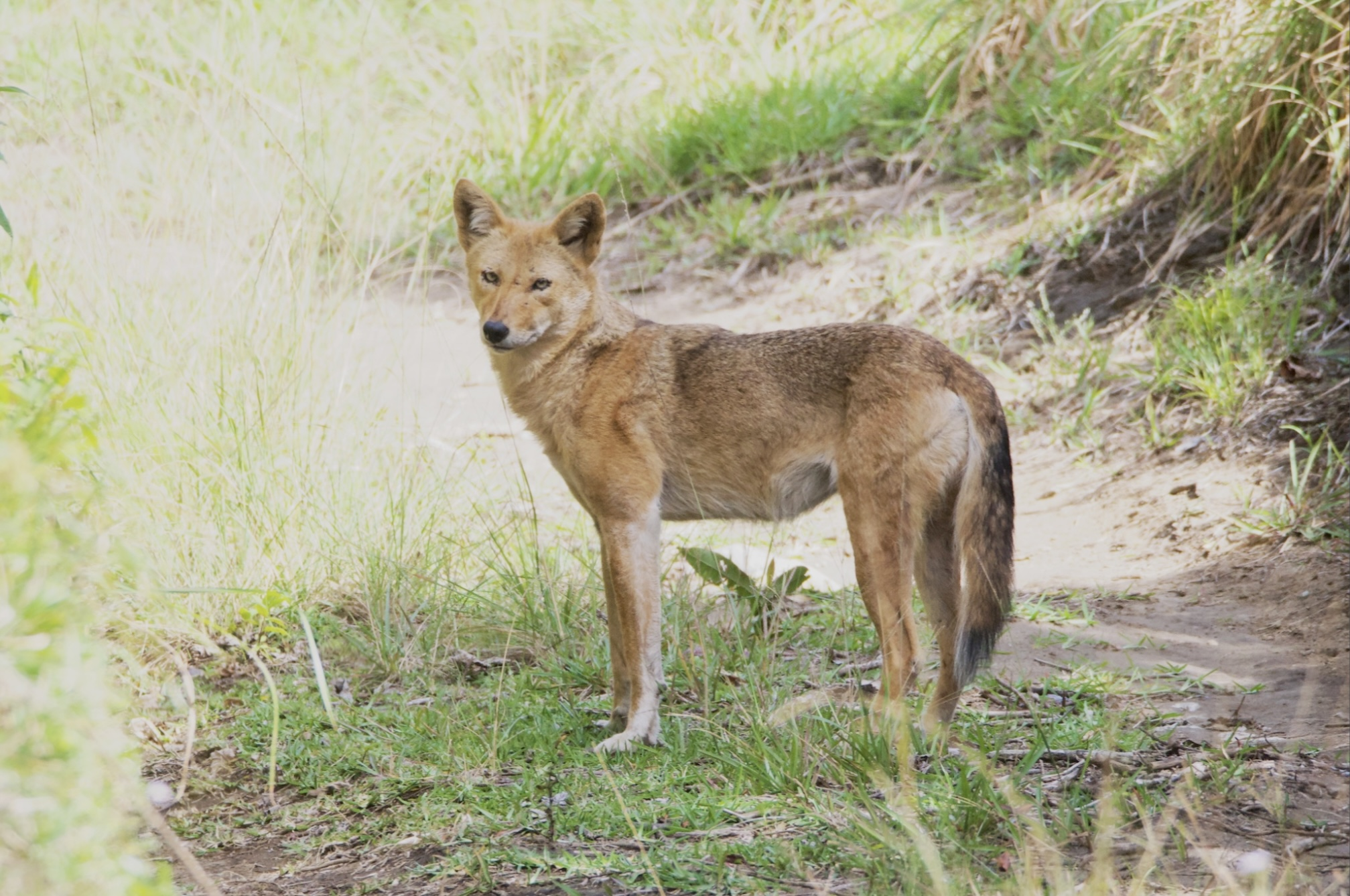
Coyote

Spectacled bear

Western lowland olingo

Greater grison

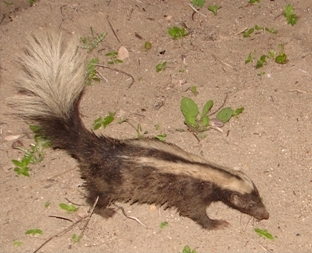
Striped hog-nosed skunk

There are over 260 species of carnivores, the majority of which eat meat as their primary dietary item. They have a characteristic skull shape and dentition.

- Suborder: Feliformia
  - Family: Felidae (cats)
    - Subfamily: Felinae
      - Genus: Herpailurus
        - Jaguarundi, Herpailurus yagouaroundi LC
      - Genus: Leopardus
        - Ocelot, Leopardus pardalis LC
        - Oncilla, Leopardus tigrinus NT
        - Margay, Leopardus wiedii LC
      - Genus: Puma
        - Cougar, Puma concolor LC
    - Subfamily: Pantherinae
      - Genus: Panthera
        - Jaguar, Panthera onca NT
- Suborder: Caniformia
  - Family: Canidae (dogs, foxes)
    - Genus: Canis
      - Coyote, Canis latrans LC
    - Genus: Cerdocyon
      - Crab-eating fox, Cerdocyon thous LC
    - Genus: Speothos
      - Bush dog, Speothos venaticus VU
    - Genus: Urocyon
      - Gray fox, Urocyon cinereoargenteus LC
  - Family: Ursidae (bears)
    - Subfamily: Tremarctinae
      - Genus: Tremarctos
        - Spectacled bear, Tremarctos ornatus VU
  - Family: Procyonidae (raccoons)
    - Genus: Bassaricyon
      - Northern olingo, Bassaricyon gabbii LR/nt
      - Western lowland olingo, Bassaricyon medius LR/lc
    - Genus: Bassariscus
      - Cacomistle, Bassariscus sumichrasti LR/nt
    - Genus: Nasua
      - White-nosed coati, Nasua narica LR/lc
    - Genus: Potos
      - Kinkajou, Potos flavus LR/lc
    - Genus: Procyon
      - Crab-eating raccoon, Procyon cancrivorus LR/lc
      - Common raccoon, Procyon lotor LR/lc
  - Galapagos sea lion
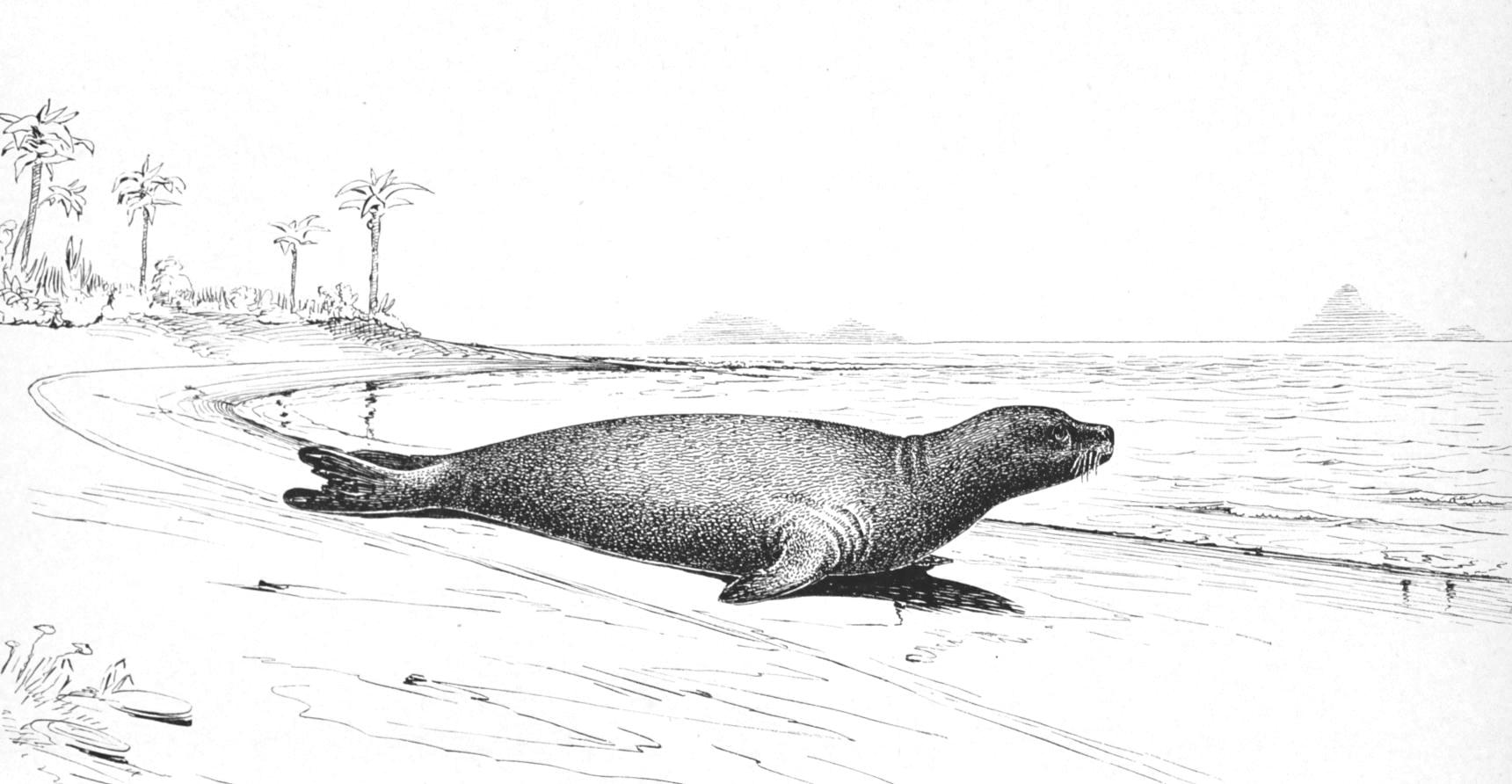
    Caribbean monk seal
    Family: Mustelidae (mustelids)
    - Genus: Eira
      - Tayra, Eira barbara LR/lc
    - Genus: Galictis
      - Greater grison, Galictis vittata LR/lc
    - Genus: Lontra
      - Neotropical river otter, Lontra longicaudis NT
    - Genus: Neogale
      - Long-tailed weasel, Neogale frenata LR/lc
  - Family: Mephitidae
    - Genus: Conepatus
      - Striped hog-nosed skunk, Conepatus semistriatus LR/lc
- Suborder: Pinnipedia
  - Family: Otariidae (eared seals)
    - Genus: Arctocephalus
      - Galapagos fur seal, Arctocephalus galapagoensis EN vagrant
    - Genus: Zalophus
      - Galapagos sea lion, Zalophus wollebaeki EN
  - Family: Phocidae (earless seals)
    - Genus: Neomonachus
      - Caribbean monk seal, Neomonachus tropicalis EX
    - Genus: Mirounga
      - Southern elephant seal, Mirounga leonina VU vagrant

==== Order: Perissodactyla (odd-toed ungulates) ====
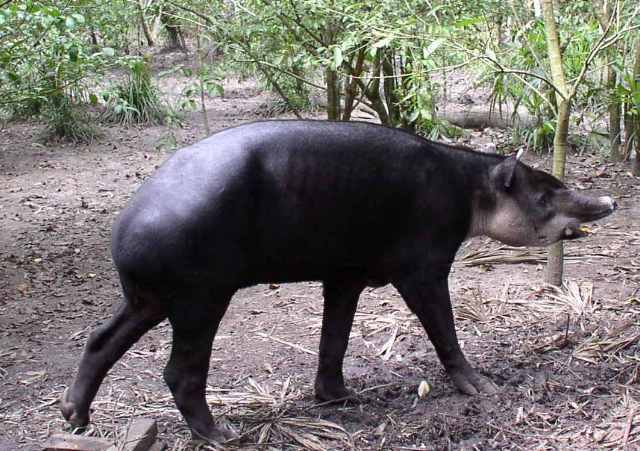
Baird's tapir

The odd-toed ungulates are browsing and grazing mammals. They are usually large to very large, and have relatively simple stomachs and a large middle toe.

- Family: Tapiridae (tapirs)
  - Genus: Tapirus
    - Baird's tapir, Tapirus bairdii EN

==== Order: Artiodactyla (even-toed ungulates) ====
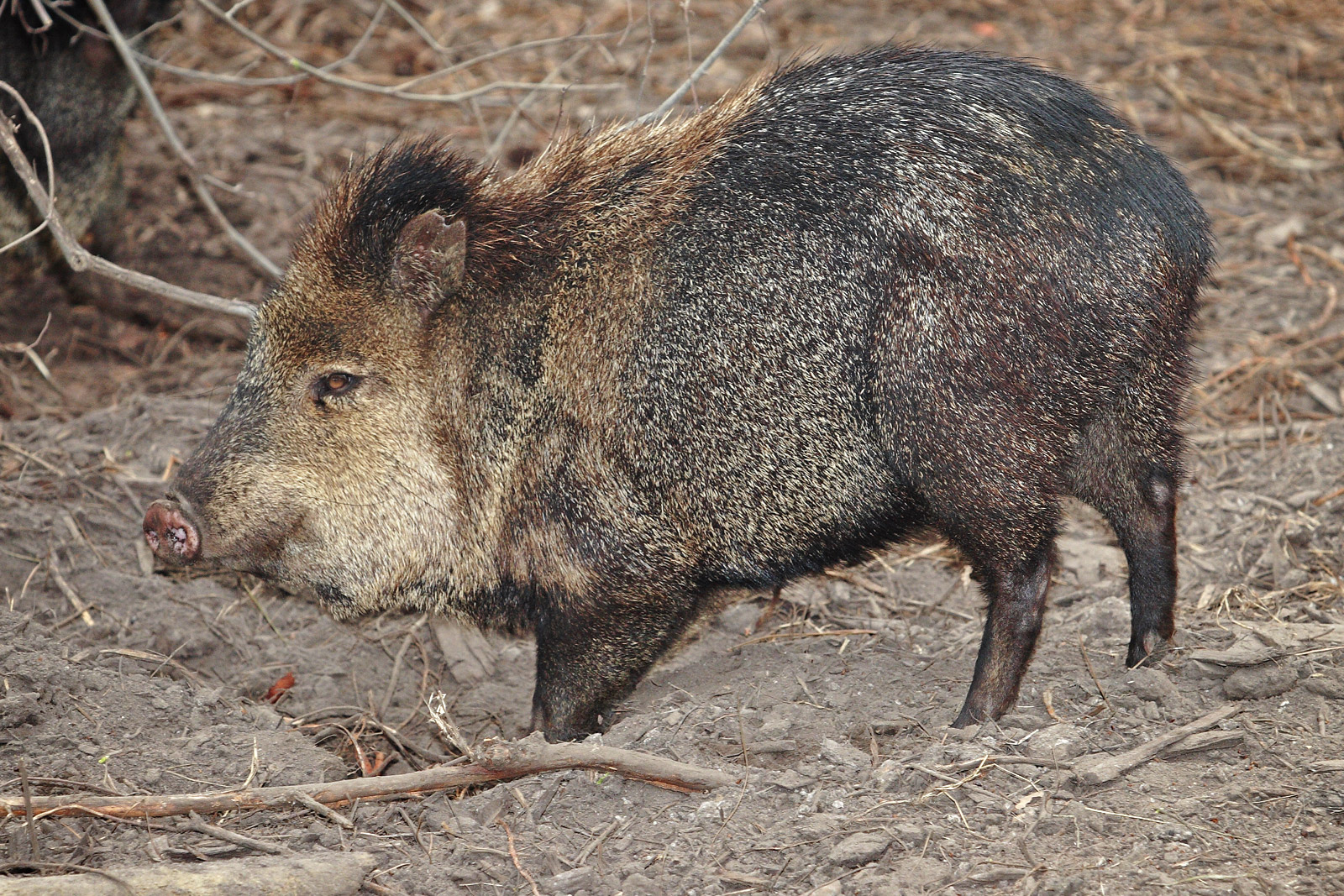
Collared peccary

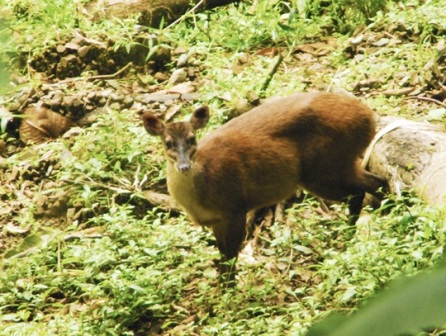
Central American red brocket

The even-toed ungulates are ungulates whose weight is borne about equally by the third and fourth toes, rather than mostly or entirely by the third as in perissodactyls. There are about 220 artiodactyl species, including many that are of great economic importance to humans.

- Family: Tayassuidae (peccaries)
  - Genus: Dicotyles
    - Collared peccary, Dicotyles tajacu LC
  - Genus: Tayassu
    - White-lipped peccary, Tayassu pecari VU
- Family: Cervidae (deer)
  - Subfamily: Capreolinae
    - Genus: Mazama
      - Central American red brocket, Mazama temama DD
    - Genus: Odocoileus
      - White-tailed deer, Odocoileus virginianus LR/lc

== See also ==
- List of chordate orders
- Lists of mammals by region
- List of prehistoric mammals
- Mammal classification
- List of mammals described in the 2000s
