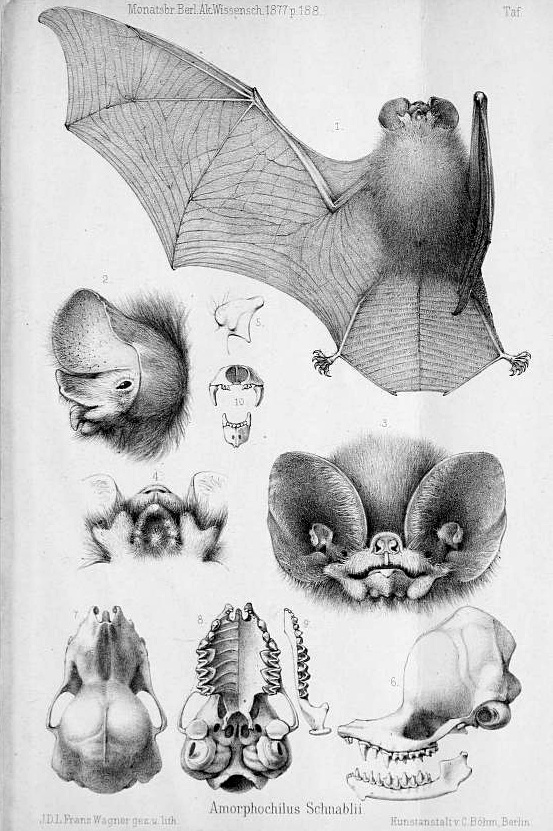

Conservation status
- Vulnerable (IUCN 3.1)

Scientific classification
- Kingdom: Animalia
- Phylum: Chordata
- Class: Mammalia
- Order: Chiroptera
- Family: Furipteridae
- Genus: Amorphochilus; Peters, 1877
- Species: A. schnablii

Binomial name
- Amorphochilus schnablii Peters, 1877
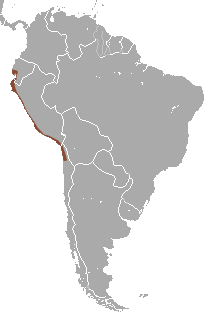

= Smoky bat =

Species of bat

The smoky bat (Amorphochilus schnablii) is a species of bat in the family Furipteridae. It is the only species within the genus Amorphochilus. Its natural habitat is rocky shores.

It is also called the thumbless bat because its thumb is partly enclosed in its wing; this common name is also applied to another species, Furipterus horrens. They lives in western Peru, western Ecuador, Puna island (Ecuador) and northern Chile. and can be found in groups of up to 300 bats. In 2013, Bat Conservation International listed this species as one of the 35 species of its worldwide priority list of conservation.

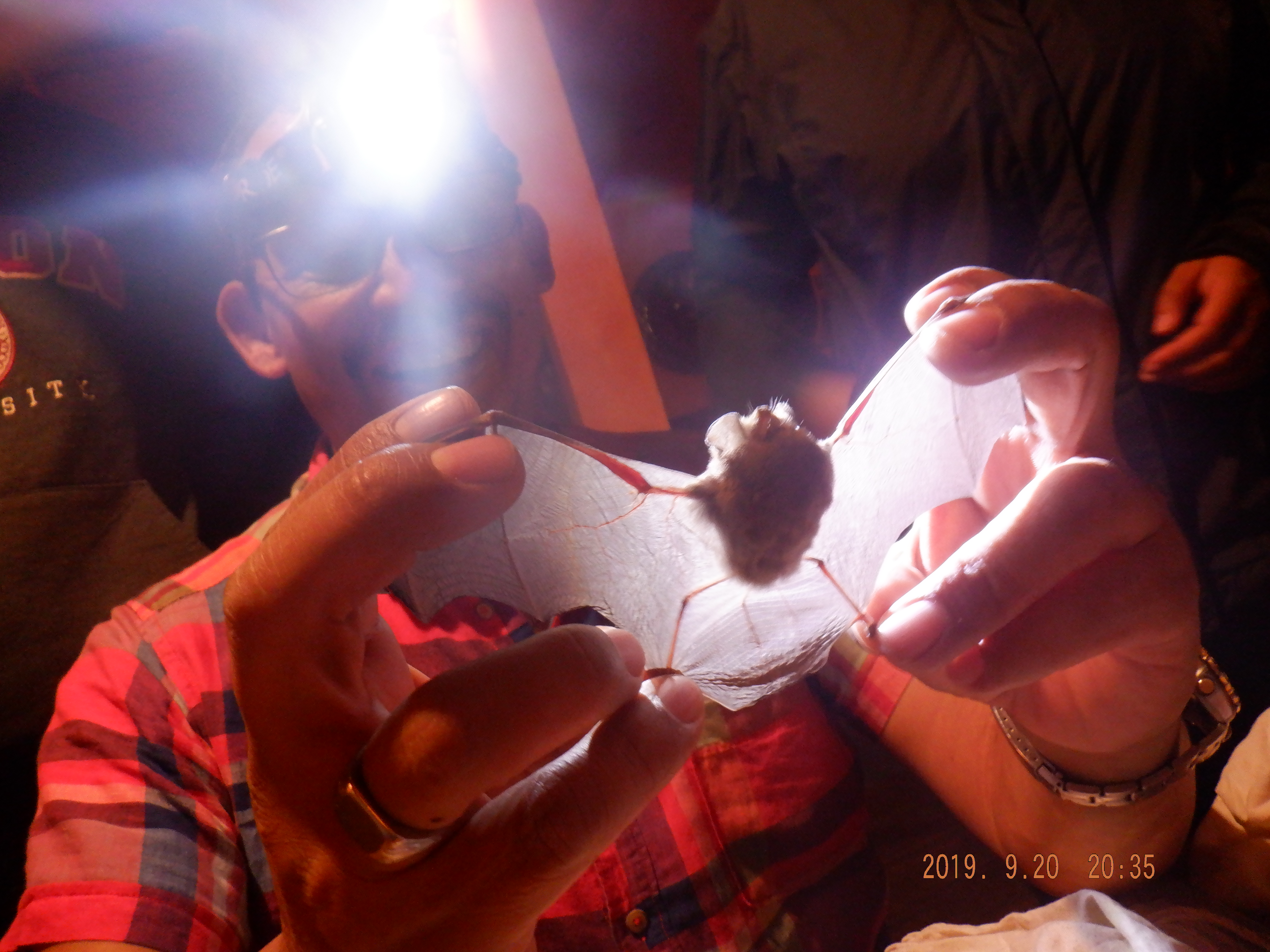
Smoky bat with wings outstretched
