= Oligoryzomys vegetus =

- Holotype skull of Oligoryzomys vegetus from Boquete, Panama.

Conservation status
- Least Concern (IUCN 3.1)

Scientific classification
- Kingdom: Animalia
- Phylum: Chordata
- Class: Mammalia
- Order: Rodentia
- Family: Cricetidae
- Subfamily: Sigmodontinae
- Genus: Oligoryzomys
- Species: O. vegetus

Binomial name
- Oligoryzomys vegetus (Bangs, 1902)

Species of rodent

Oligoryzomys vegetus, also known as the sprightly colilargo or sprightly pygmy rice rat, is a species of rodent in the genus Oligoryzomys of family Cricetidae. It is found only in the mountains of Costa Rica and western Panama.

== Literature cited ==
- Musser, G. G.; Carleton, M. D. (2005). "Superfamily Muroidea". In Wilson, D. E.; Reeder, D. M. (eds.). Mammal Species of the World: A Taxonomic and Geographic Reference (3rd ed.). Johns Hopkins University Press. pp. 894–1531. ISBN 978-0-8018-8221-0. OCLC 62265494.
