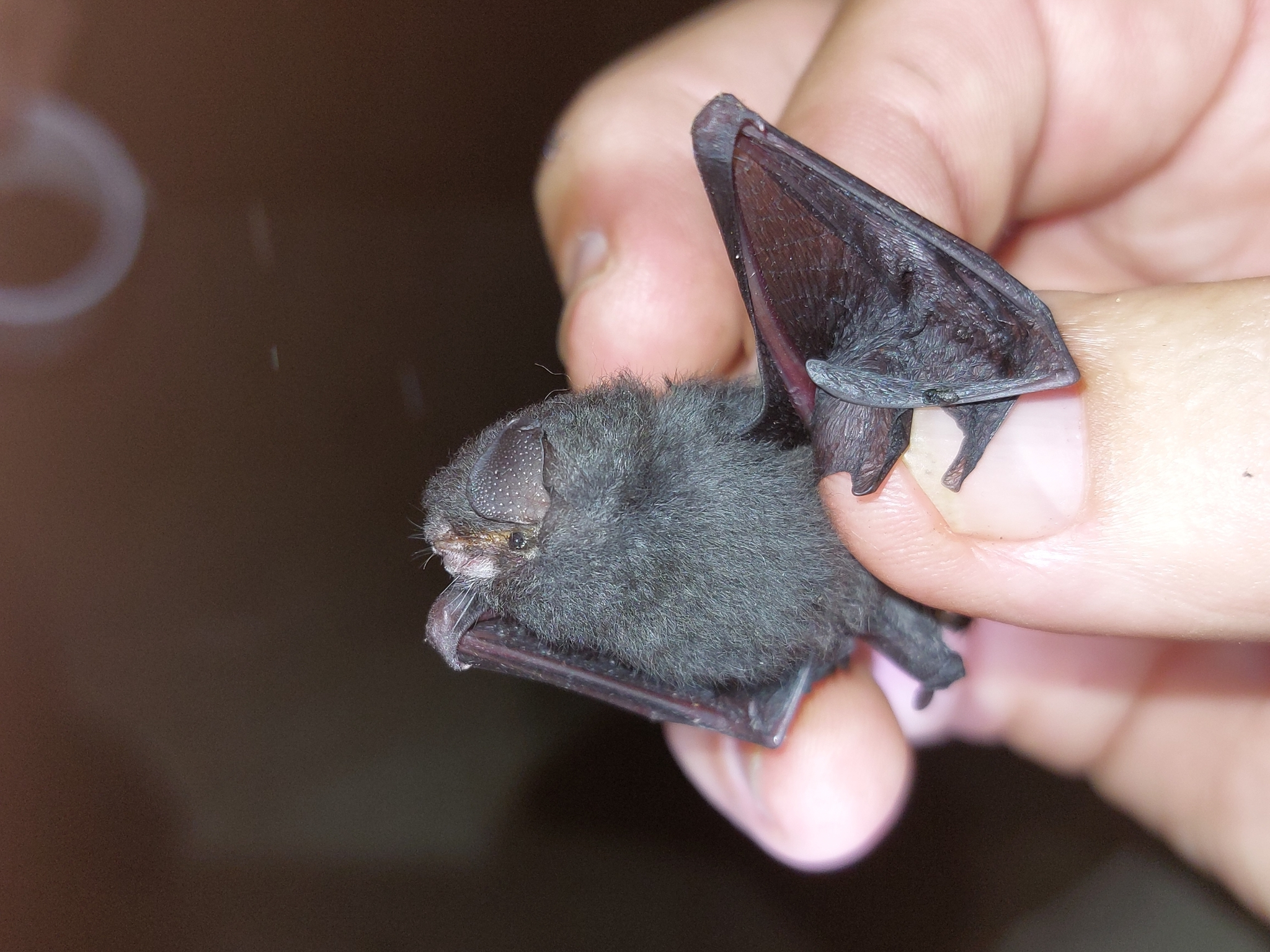

Conservation status
- Least Concern (IUCN 3.1)

Scientific classification
- Kingdom: Animalia
- Phylum: Chordata
- Class: Mammalia
- Order: Chiroptera
- Family: Furipteridae
- Genus: Furipterus; Bonaparte, 1837
- Species: F. horrens

Binomial name
- Furipterus horrens (F. Cuvier, 1828)
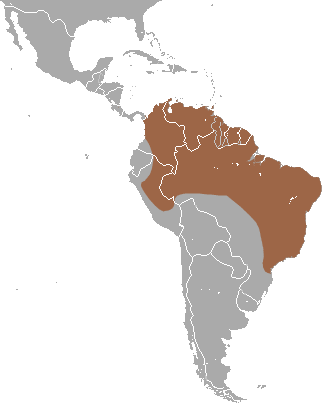

= Thumbless bat =

Species of bat

The thumbless bat (Furipterus horrens) is a species of insectivorous bat in the family Furipteridae, in the monotypic genus Furipterus. They have a small thumb which is included in the membrane of the wing, causing the 'thumbless' appearance.

== Taxonomy ==
The thumbless bat belongs to the family Furipteridae (Mammalia: Chiroptera) which is currently composed of only two genera: Amorphochilus and Furipterus. Both genera are monotypic. The first description of the species was proposed by Frédéric Cuvier in 1828, separating the taxon to a new genus Furia. The taxon was reassigned to Furipterus in 1839 by Charles Bonaparte.

== Geographic range ==
The thumbless bat is found in Central and South America. Its range includes Costa Rica, Panama, southern Brazil and Bolivia. as well as Venezuela, Colombia, Ecuador, Suriname, French Guiana, Guyana, Panama, Trinidad, and Peru. In Brazil, it was recorded in twelve different regions covering the Amazon, Caatinga, Cerrado and Atlantic Forest biomes.

== Population and behavior ==
Its populations are rare and very local, but widespread. Male and female bats may live separately during some parts of the year. There were found more than 60 males occupying one hollow. Thumbless bats are aerial and insectivorous.

The thumbless bat is found in caves. Additionally, it is associated with moist environments. Thumbless bats were detected significantly more frequently over large lakes(Emmons and Feer 1997). The moist habitat plays a key role for aerial insectivorous bats. However, thumbless bat's activity is significantly higher in forest compared to the lakes. They roots in small clusters in colonies for up to 60 individuals in caves. The nests are located in deep cracks between rocks.
