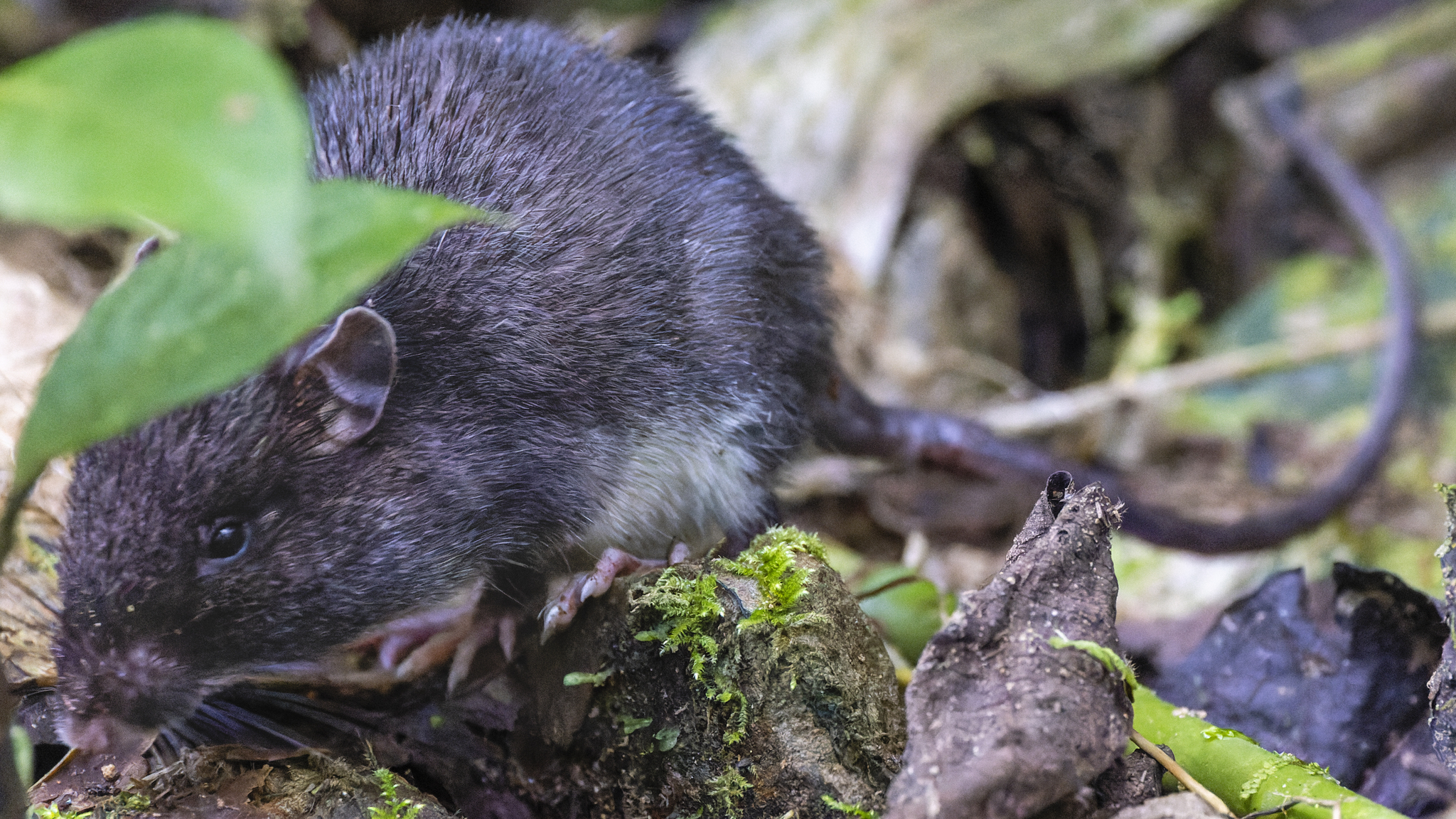

Conservation status
- Least Concern (IUCN 3.1)

Scientific classification
- Kingdom: Animalia
- Phylum: Chordata
- Class: Mammalia
- Order: Rodentia
- Family: Heteromyidae
- Genus: Heteromys
- Species: H. australis

Binomial name
- Heteromys australis Thomas, 1901

= Southern spiny pocket mouse =

Species of rodent

The southern spiny pocket mouse (Heteromys australis) is a species of rodent in the family Heteromyidae. It is found in Colombia, Ecuador, and Panama.
