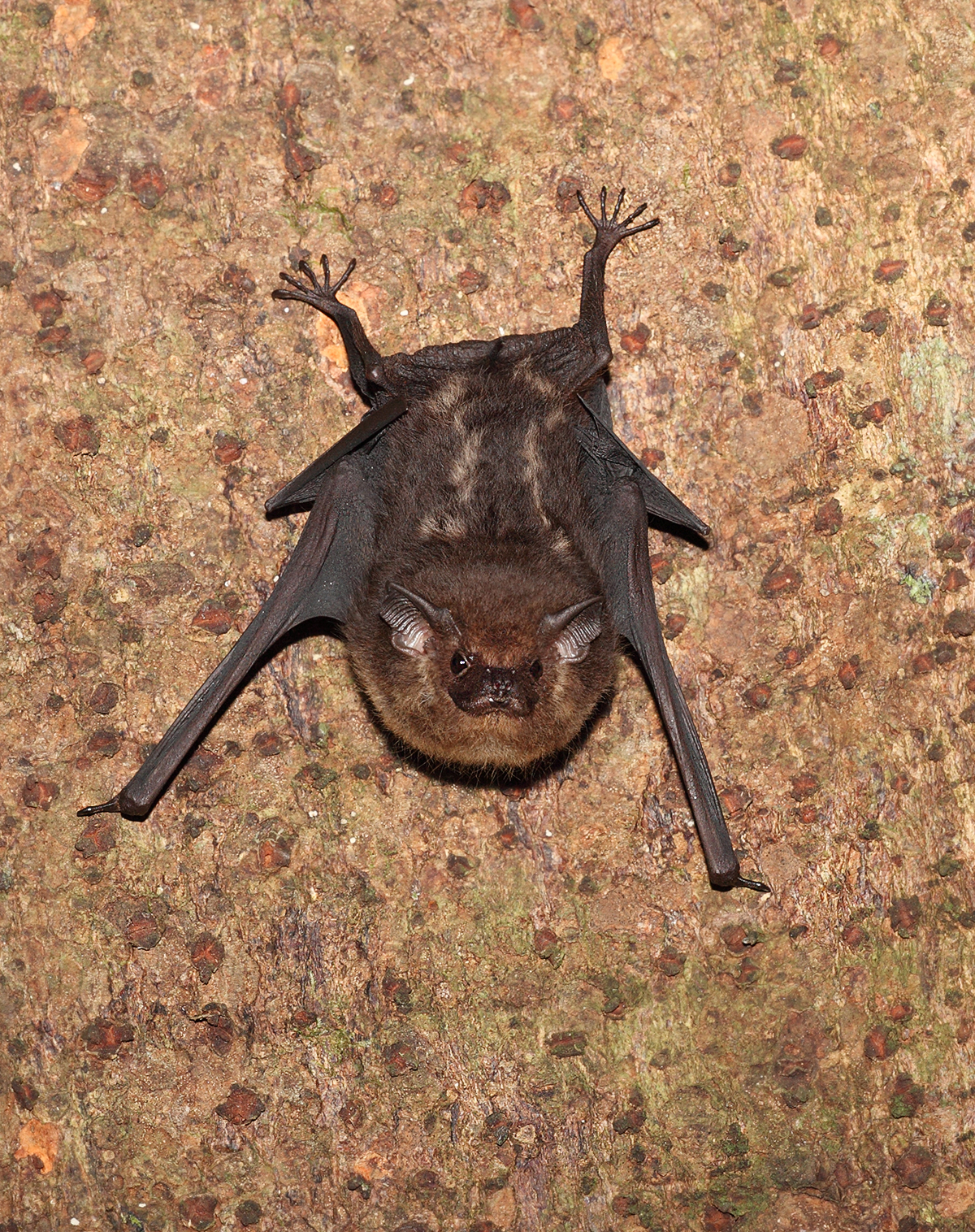
- Saccopteryx sp.

Scientific classification
- Domain: Eukaryota
- Kingdom: Animalia
- Phylum: Chordata
- Class: Mammalia
- Order: Chiroptera
- Family: Emballonuridae
- Genus: Saccopteryx; Illiger, 1811

Type species
- Vespertilio lepturus Schreber, 1774

Species
- Saccopteryx antioquensis Saccopteryx bilineata Saccopteryx canescens Saccopteryx gymnura Saccopteryx leptura

= Saccopteryx =

Genus of mammals

Saccopteryx is a genus of sac-winged bats from Central and South America. The species within this genus are:

- Antioquian sac-winged bat Saccopteryx antioquensis
- Greater sac-winged bat Saccopteryx bilineata
- Frosted sac-winged bat Saccopteryx canescens
- Amazonian sac-winged bat Saccopteryx gymnura
- Lesser sac-winged bat Saccopteryx leptura
