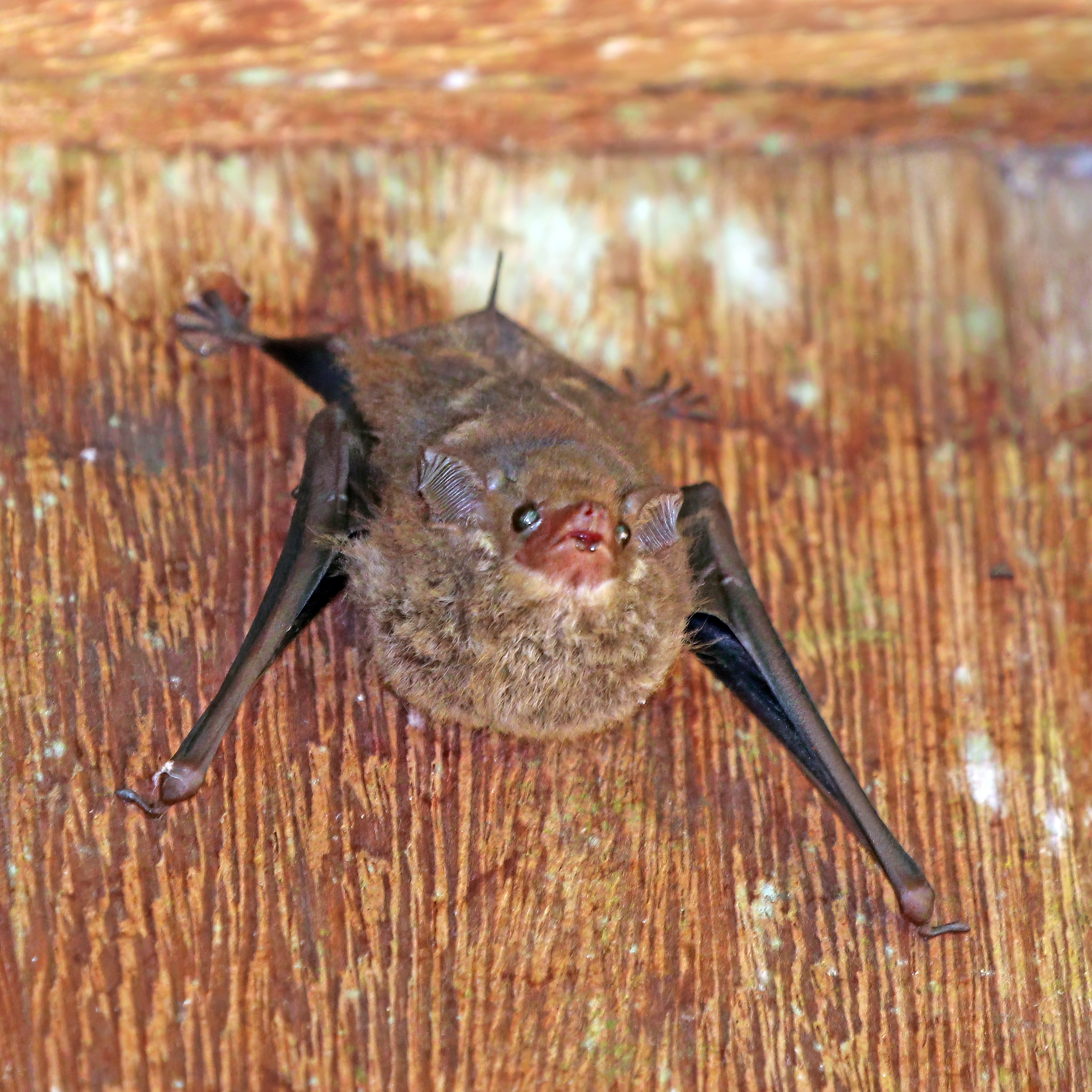

Conservation status
- Least Concern (IUCN 3.1)

Scientific classification
- Kingdom: Animalia
- Phylum: Chordata
- Class: Mammalia
- Order: Chiroptera
- Family: Emballonuridae
- Genus: Saccopteryx
- Species: S. bilineata

Binomial name
- Saccopteryx bilineata (Temminck, 1838)
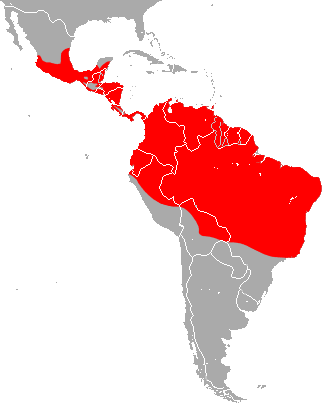
- Greater sac-winged bat range

= Greater sac-winged bat =

Species of bat

The greater sac-winged bat (Saccopteryx bilineata) is a bat of the family Emballonuridae native to Central and South America.

They are common bats seen in the rainforest, as they often roost on the outside of large trees. They are insectivores and use echolocation calls through the mouth to track their prey, which includes flies, beetles, butterflies and moths. The long nose and upper lip are highly mobile and can shift upward to enlarge the mouth opening.

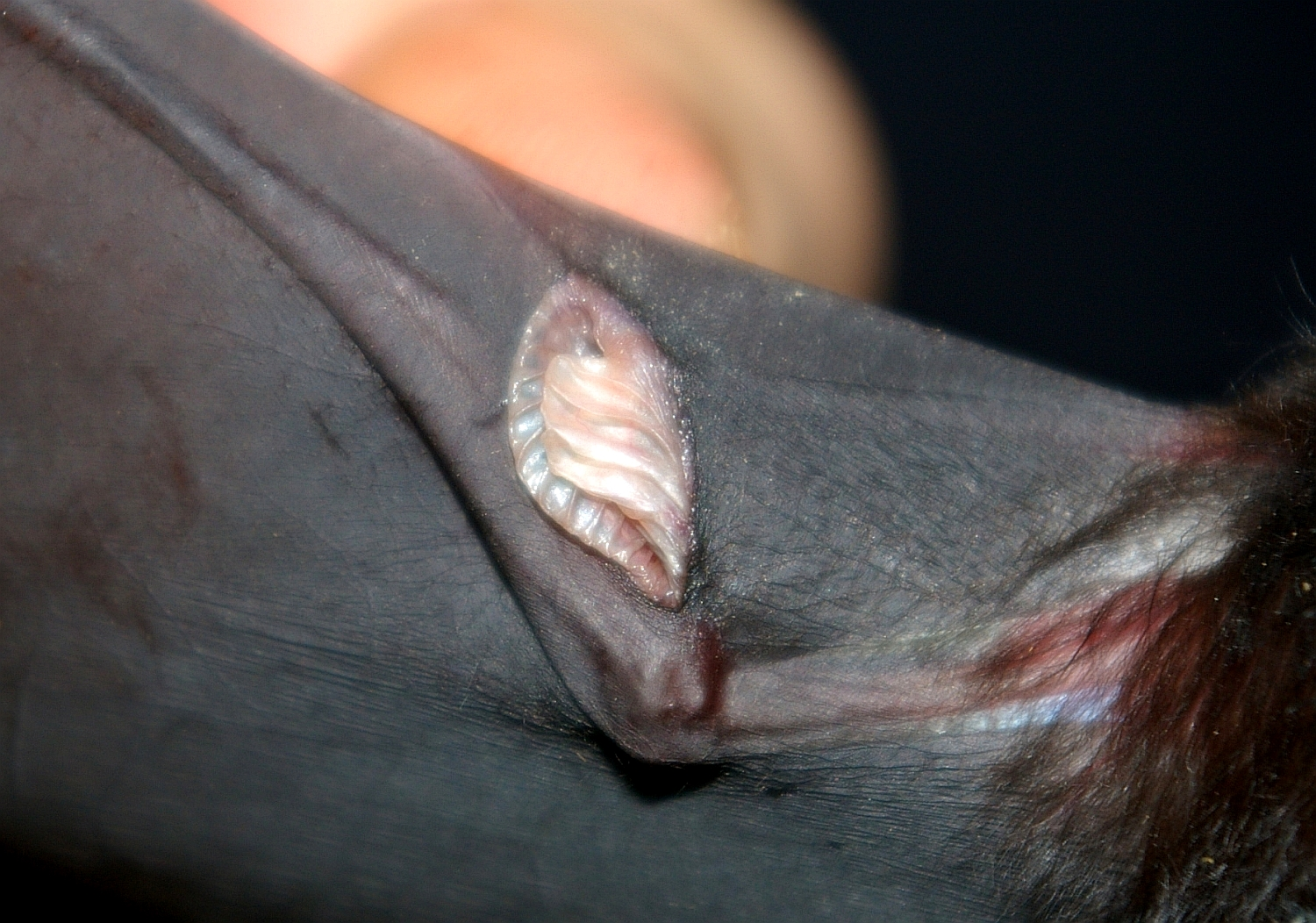
Close-up of male wing pouch

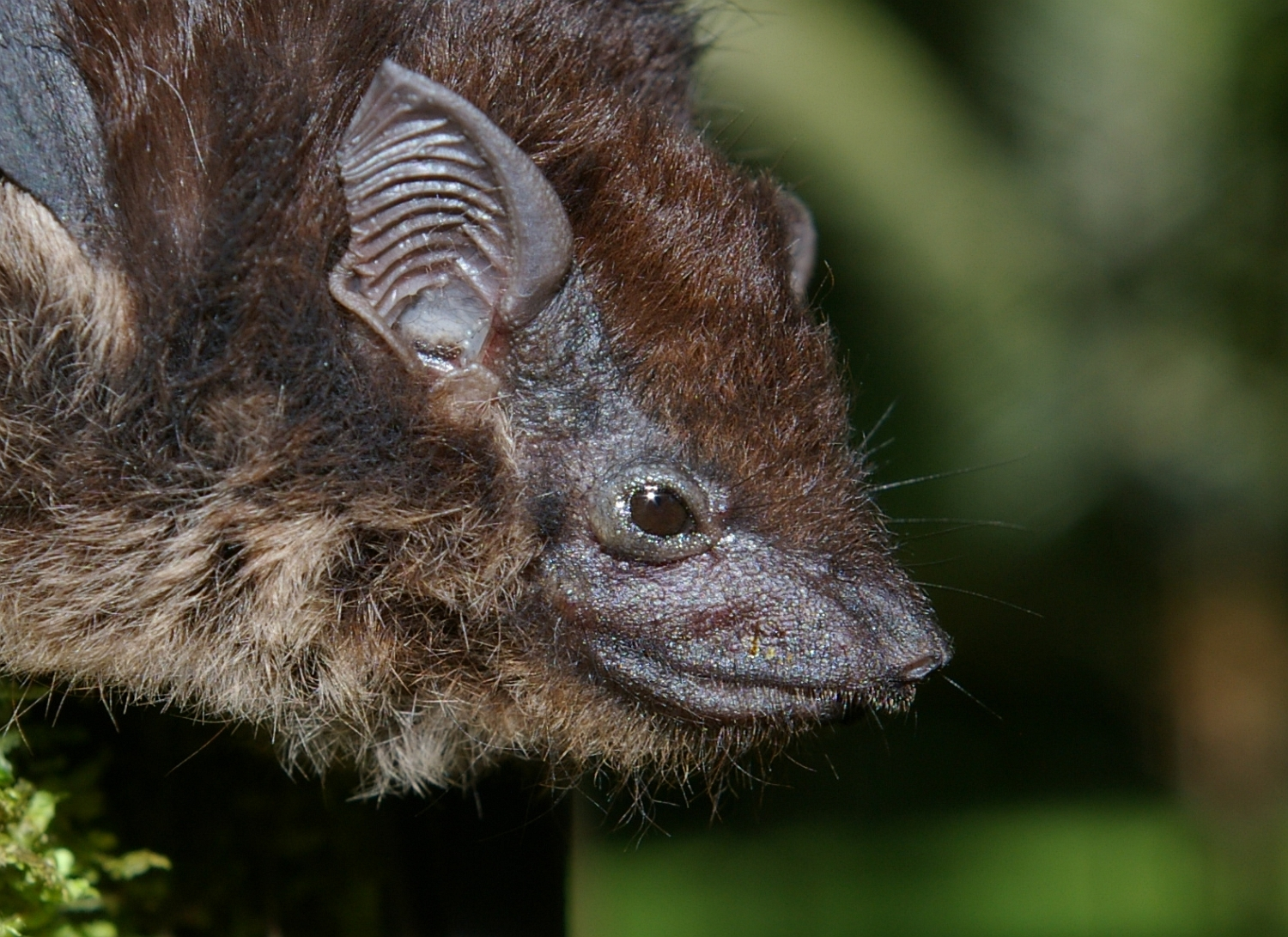
Close-up of a greater sac-winged bat

The term "sac-winged" refers to small pouches on the wings. These sacs are used by males to attract females and to mark their harem territory. During daily grooming, males will fill these sacs with drops of urine and glandular secretions. During displays for females, the male will hover in front of the female and fan her vigorously to expose her to the scent of the mixture in the wing sacs. Males will also shake the contents of the sac towards bats outside of the male's harem territory to warn off intruders. Microbial fermentation in the sac may produce identifiable scent signals.

Sac-wing pups have been recorded making various calls in a jumbled context. For example, a female pup will give the male trill of courting followed by echolocation clicks then adult territorial challenges. These mixed-up vocalizations have been equated with human infant babbling and mispronounced songs of young birds. This is the first example of mammal babbling outside of the primate order.

Saccopteryx bilineata scenting display call (slow-mo)
Recorded at the Tiputini Biodiversity Station
