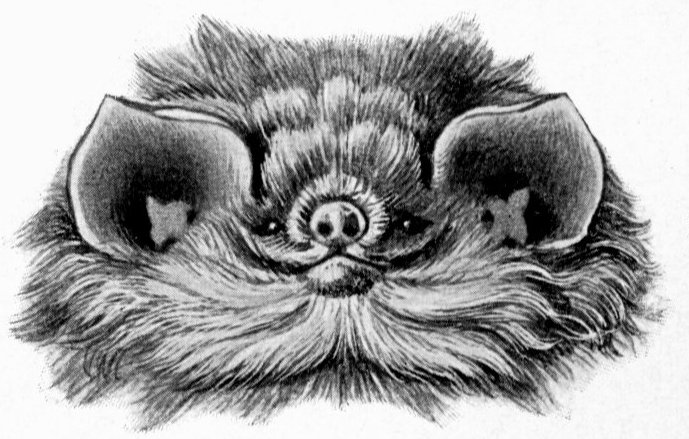
- Thumbless bat (Furipterus horrens)

Scientific classification
- Kingdom: Animalia
- Phylum: Chordata
- Class: Mammalia
- Order: Chiroptera
- Superfamily: Noctilionoidea
- Family: Furipteridae; Gray, 1866

Type genus
- Furipterus Bonaparte, 1837

Genera
- Amorphochilus; Furipterus
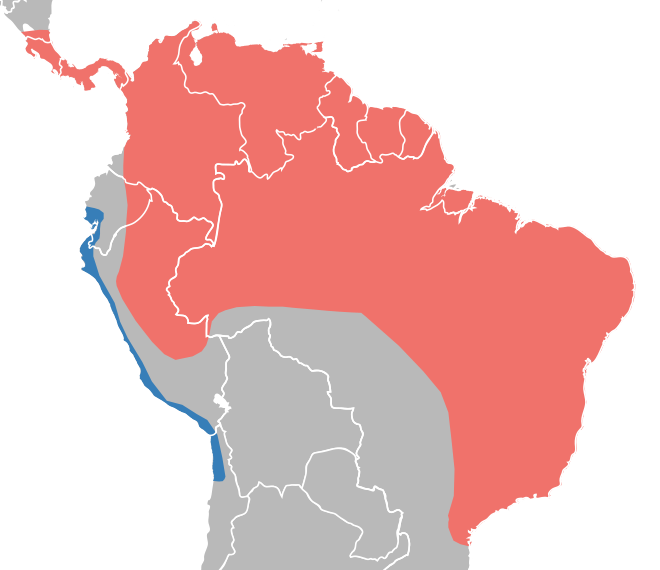
- Furipteridae distribution Amorphochilus schnablii in blue; Furipterus horrens in red

= Furipteridae =

Smoky bats

Family of bats

Furipteridae is family of bats, allying two genera of single species, Amorphochilus schnablii (smoky bat) and the type Furipterus horrens (thumbless bat). They are found in Central and South America and are closely related to the bats in the families Natalidae and Thyropteridae. The species are distinguished by their reduced or functionless thumbs, enclosed by the wing membranes, and their broad, funnel-shaped ears. They are insectivorous and can live in many different kinds of environments. They have greyish fur, and a small nose-leaf. Like many bats, they roost in caves.

== Taxonomy ==
- Genus Amorphochilus
  - Amorphochilus schnablii, smoky bat
- Genus Furipterus
  - Furipterus horrens, thumbless bat
