= Yellow isthmus rat =

Conservation status
- Near Threatened (IUCN 3.1)

Scientific classification
- Kingdom: Animalia
- Phylum: Chordata
- Class: Mammalia
- Order: Rodentia
- Family: Cricetidae
- Subfamily: Neotominae
- Genus: Isthmomys
- Species: I. flavidus

Binomial name
- Isthmomys flavidus (Bangs, 1902)

Species of rodent

The yellow isthmus rat (Isthmomys flavidus) is a species of rodent in the family Cricetidae. It is found only in Panama. It was discovered by W. W. Brown Jr. on the southern slope of Volcan de Chiriqui (8° 49' N, 82° 32' W). He found it common in the upland forest from 1000 to 1500m, but no specimens were taken above or below these elevations (Bangs 1902; Goldman 1920; Goodwin 1946). Museum records specify two isolated populations in western Panama, one at Cerro Colorado where R. Pine et al. collected in 1980 (8° 31' 60N, 81° 49' 0W) and at Cerro Hoya on the Azuero Peninsula by C. Handley in 1962 (7° 23' N, 80° 38' W). The presence of I. flavidus or a closely allied form in Costa Rica is probable (Goodwin 1946), however, no specimens have been reported. There are no currently known fossil records of Isthmomys (McKenna and Bell 1997).
