= Isthmomys =

Scientific classification
- Domain: Eukaryota
- Kingdom: Animalia
- Phylum: Chordata
- Class: Mammalia
- Order: Rodentia
- Family: Cricetidae
- Subfamily: Neotominae
- Tribe: Reithrodontomyini
- Genus: Isthmomys; Hooper & Musser, 1964

Type species
- Megadontomys flavidus

Species
- Isthmomys flavidus Isthmomys pirrensis

Genus of rodents

Isthmomys is a genus of rodent in the family Cricetidae, belonging to the tribe Reithrodontomyini. Species are:

- Yellow isthmus rat (Isthmomys flavidus)
- Mount Pirri isthmus rat (Isthmomys pirrensis)
