= Mount Pirri isthmus rat =

Conservation status
- Least Concern (IUCN 3.1)

Scientific classification
- Kingdom: Animalia
- Phylum: Chordata
- Class: Mammalia
- Order: Rodentia
- Family: Cricetidae
- Subfamily: Neotominae
- Genus: Isthmomys
- Species: I. pirrensis

Binomial name
- Isthmomys pirrensis (Goldman, 1912)

Species of rodent

The Mount Pirri isthmus rat (Isthmomys pirrensis) is a species of rodent in the family Cricetidae.

Its natural habitat is subtropical or tropical moist lowland forests. It is found only in Panama. At the time of its discovery, it was considered as the "most common rat of southeastern Panama". Found only in the eastern region of Darien, I. pirrensis appears to be a relict species confined to the Panamanian side of the Serrania del Darien. Its occurrence on the Colombian side of the Serrania has been suggested without documentation of specimens.

Although neotomine-peromyscine rodents have historically been the subject of systematic research, studies involving Isthmomys have generally excluded I. flavidus due to its rarity in museum collections and the unavailability of tissue samples for molecular analysis. In addition, morphological and physiological studies involving I. flavidus used specimens from the Cerro Hoya locality which was originally proposed as a geographic race of I. pirrensis.
