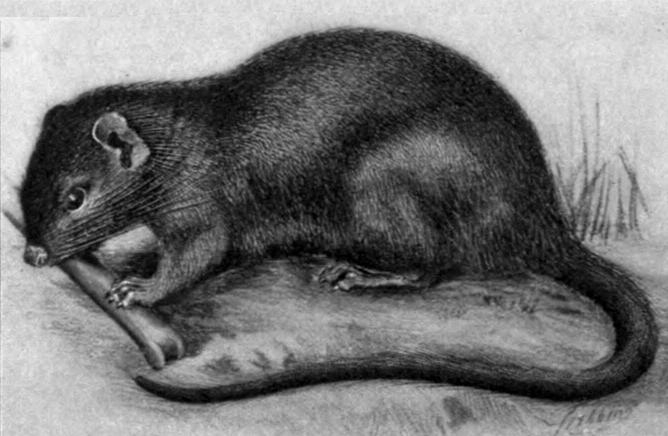

Conservation status
- Least Concern (IUCN 3.1)

Scientific classification
- Kingdom: Animalia
- Phylum: Chordata
- Class: Mammalia
- Infraclass: Placentalia
- Order: Rodentia
- Family: Echimyidae
- Genus: Diplomys
- Species: D. labilis

Binomial name
- Diplomys labilis (Bangs, 1901)
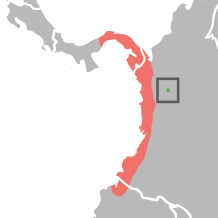
- Diplomys distribution D. labilis in red

Synonyms
- Isothrix darlingi Goldman, 1913

= Rufous soft-furred spiny rat =

Species of rodent

The rufous soft-furred spiny-rat (Diplomys labilis), known as ratón espinoso meaning "spiny" or "thorny" rat in Spanish, is a species of rodent in the family Echimyidae. It is found in Colombia, Ecuador, and Panama. In November 2015, it was spotted for the first time in Osa, Costa Rica by the Costa Rican researcher Jim Córdoba-Alfaro.

It is nocturnal and lives in trees, feeding on fruit and young shoots. The females give birth to one or two young, which stay with the mother for about a year before becoming mature.
