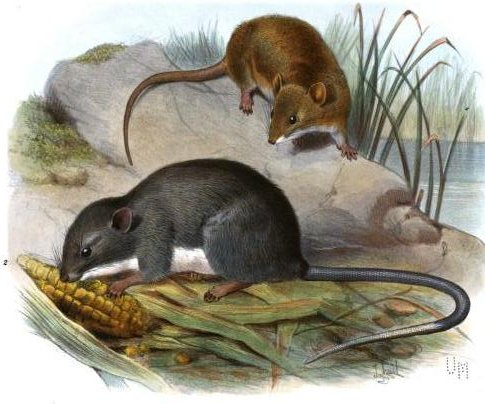
- Tylomys panamensis (lower animal).

Scientific classification
- Kingdom: Animalia
- Phylum: Chordata
- Class: Mammalia
- Infraclass: Placentalia
- Order: Rodentia
- Family: Cricetidae
- Subfamily: Tylomyinae; Reig, 1984

Genera
- Otonyctomys; Nyctomys; Tylomys; Ototylomys

= Tylomyinae =

Tylomyines

Subfamily of rodents

The subfamily Tylomyinae consists of several species of New World rats and mice including the vesper and climbing rats. They are not as well known as their relatives in the subfamilies Sigmodontinae and Neotominae.

== List of Species ==
- SUBFAMILY TYLOMYINAE
  - Tribe Nyctomyini
    - Genus Otonyctomys
      - Hatt's vesper rat, Otonyctomys hatti
    - Genus Nyctomys
      - Sumichrast's vesper rat, Nyctomys sumichrasti
  - Tribe Tylomyini
    - Genus Tylomys
      - Chiapan climbing rat, Tylomys bullaris
      - Fulvous-bellied climbing rat, Tylomys fulviventer
      - Mira climbing rat, Tylomys mirae
      - Peters's climbing rat, Tylomys nudicaudus
      - Panamanian climbing rat, Tylomys panamensis
      - Tumbala climbing rat, Tylomys tumbalensis
      - Watson's climbing rat, Tylomys watsoni
    - Genus Ototylomys
      - Big-eared climbing rat, Ototylomys phyllotis
      - La Pera big-eared climbing rat, Ototylomys chiapensis

== See also ==
- New World rats and mice
