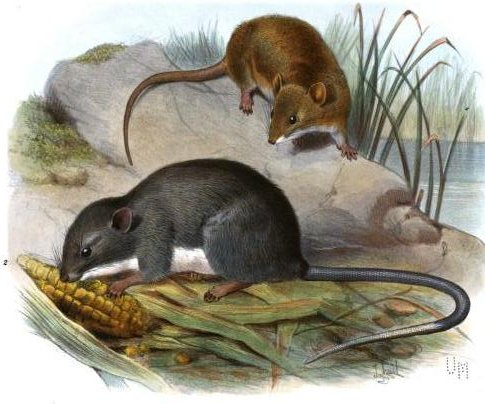
- Tylomys panamensis (lower animal).

Scientific classification
- Kingdom: Animalia
- Phylum: Chordata
- Class: Mammalia
- Order: Rodentia
- Family: Cricetidae
- Subfamily: Tylomyinae
- Tribe: Tylomyini; Reig, 1984

Genera
- Tylomys; Ototylomys

= Tylomyini =

Tylomyini Temporal range: Pleistocene - Recent

Tribe of rodents

Tylomyini is a tribe of New World rats and mice in the subfamily Tylomyinae. The rats share the characteristics of all being climbing rats.

== Classification ==
Tribe Tylomyini

- GenusTylomys
  - Chiapan climbing rat, Tylomys bullaris
  - Fulvous-bellied climbing rat, Tylomys fulviventer
  - Mira climbing rat, Tylomys mirae
  - Peters's climbing rat, Tylomys nudicaudus
  - Panamanian climbing rat, Tylomys panamensis
  - Tumbala climbing rat, Tylomys tumbalensis
  - Watson's climbing rat, Tylomys watsoni
- Genus Ototylomys
  - Big-eared climbing rat, Ototylomys phyllotis
  - La Pera big-eared climbing rat, Ototylomys chiapensis
