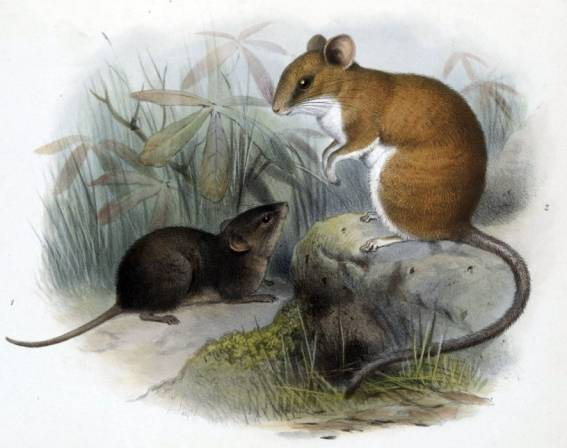
- Nyctomys sumichrasti (right)

Scientific classification
- Kingdom: Animalia
- Phylum: Chordata
- Class: Mammalia
- Infraclass: Placentalia
- Order: Rodentia
- Family: Cricetidae
- Subfamily: Tylomyinae
- Tribe: Nyctomyini; Musser and Carleton, 2005

Genera
- Otonyctomys; Nyctomys

= Nyctomyini =

Nyctomyini Temporal range: Pleistocene - Recent

Tribe of rodents

Nyctomyini is a tribe of New World rats and mice in the subfamily Tylomyinae which includes two genera, Nyctomys and Otonyctomys, each with a single species. Both are medium-sized rats with tawny to brownish fur and a hairy tail.

== Classification ==
Tribe Nyctomyini

- Genus Otonyctomys
  - Hatt's vesper rat, Otonyctomys hatti
- Genus Nyctomys
  - Sumichrast's vesper rat, Nyctomys sumichrasti
