= Climbing rat =

Climbing rat may refer to the following rodents:

- Anonymomys, the Mindoro tree rat, from the Philippines;
- Ototylomys, the big-eared climbing rat, from Central America;
- Tylomys (various species), from Mexico to Ecuador.
