= Whartonia carpenteri =

Scientific classification
- Kingdom: Animalia
- Phylum: Arthropoda
- Subphylum: Chelicerata
- Class: Arachnida
- Order: Trombidiformes
- Family: Trombiculidae
- Genus: Whartonia
- Species: W. carpenteri

Binomial name
- Whartonia carpenteri Brennan, 1962

Species of mite

Whartonia carpenteri is a species of trombiculid mite collected from the eastern red bat, Lasiurus borealis, and the gray sac-winged bat, Balantiopteryx plicata.

== Range ==
Whartonia carpenteri has been recorded from the State of Morelos in central Mexico.

== Taxonomy ==
The species is classified in the subgenus Asolentria. The specific epithet honors "Lt. Cmdr. Malcolm Scott Carpenter, USA, who completed three orbits of the earth in the Aurora VII, 24 May 1962."
