= Villa's yellow-eared bat =

Scientific classification
- Kingdom: Animalia
- Phylum: Chordata
- Class: Mammalia
- Order: Chiroptera
- Family: Phyllostomidae
- Genus: Vampyressa
- Species: V. villai

Binomial name
- Vampyressa villai Garbino, Hernández-Canchola, León-Paniagua & Tavares, 2024

Species of bat

Villa's little yellow-eared bat (Vampyressa villai) is a bat species found in Mexico to the west of the Isthmus of Tehuantepec. It is known from the Mexican states of Oaxaca, Guerrero, and Veracruz.

== See also ==
- List of living mammal species described in the 2020s
