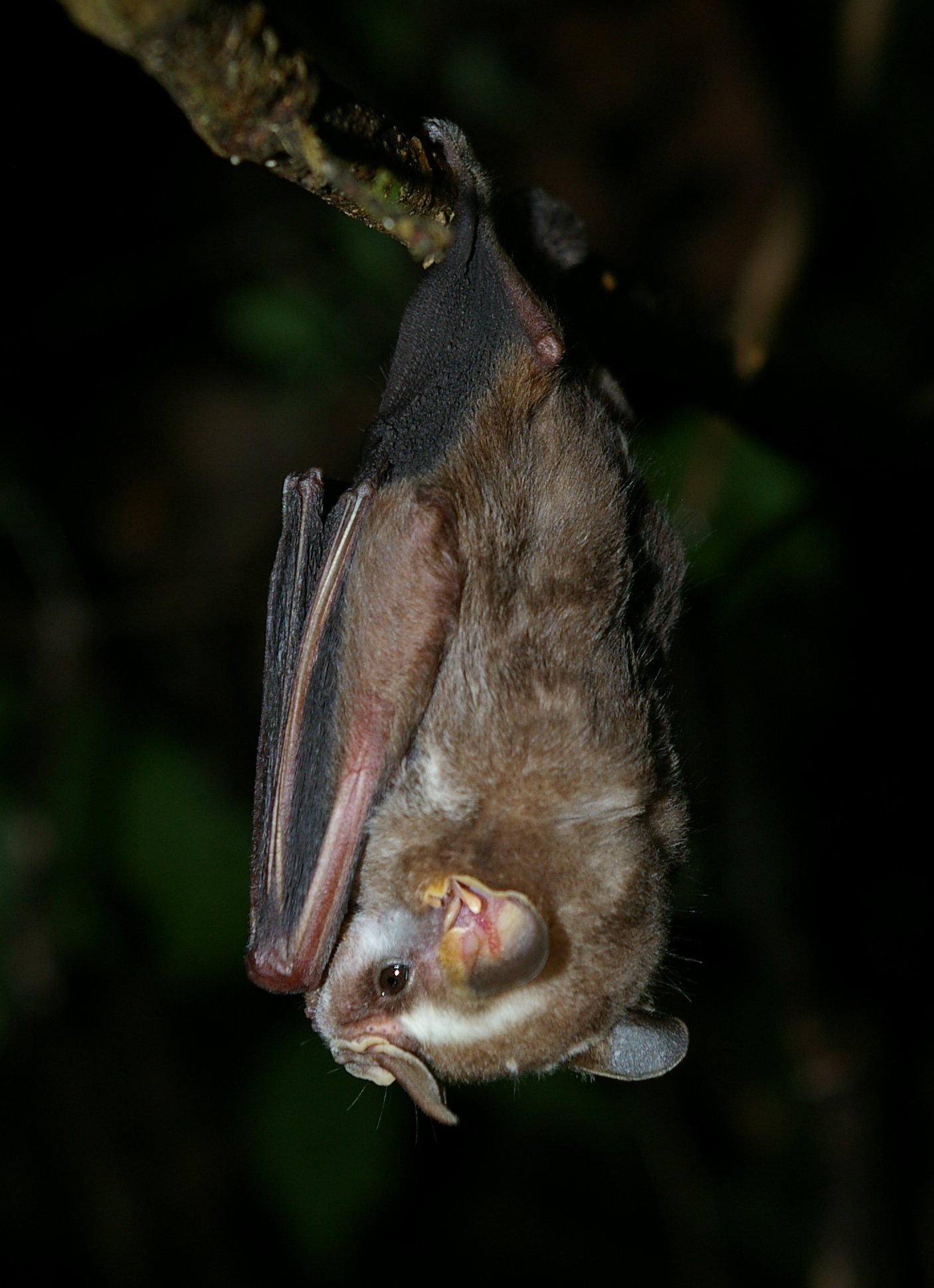
- Striped yellow-eared bat (Vampyriscus nymphaea)

Scientific classification
- Domain: Eukaryota
- Kingdom: Animalia
- Phylum: Chordata
- Class: Mammalia
- Order: Chiroptera
- Family: Phyllostomidae
- Subfamily: Stenodermatinae
- Genus: Vampyriscus; Thomas, 1900

Species
- 3, see text

= Vampyriscus =

Genus of bats

Vampyriscus (meaning: small vampire bat) is a genus of bats in the family Phyllostomidae, the leaf-nosed bats.

There are three species previously included in the genus Vampyressa. The two genera are differentiated by the morphology of their bones and teeth and the pattern of their pelage. Phylogenetic analyses support the separation of the genera. Older sources recognize Vampyriscus as a subgenus of Vampyressa.

Species:

- Vampyriscus bidens – bidentate yellow-eared bat
- Vampyriscus brocki – Brock's yellow-eared bat
- Vampyriscus nymphaeus – striped yellow-eared bat
