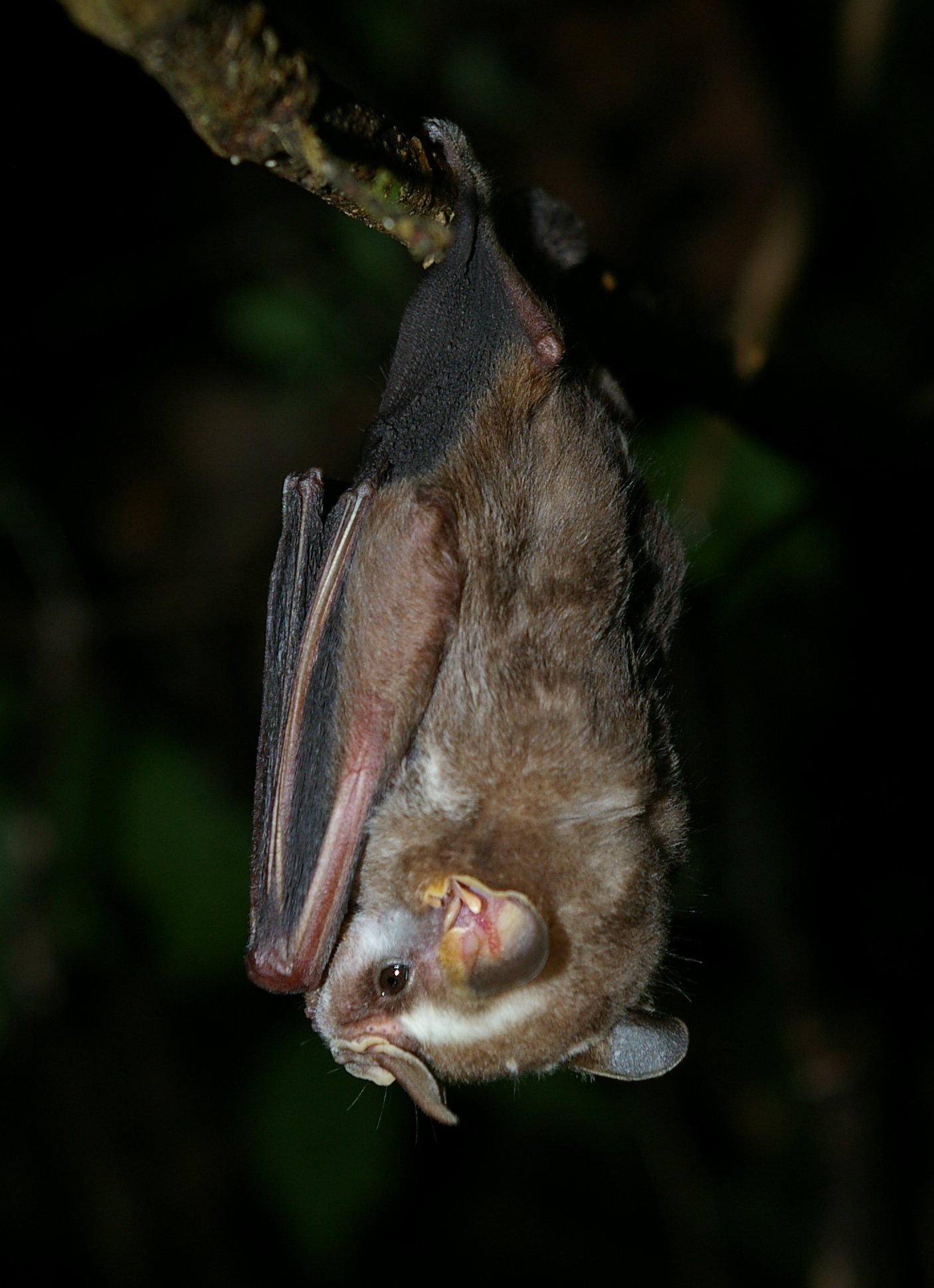

Conservation status
- Least Concern (IUCN 3.1)

Scientific classification
- Kingdom: Animalia
- Phylum: Chordata
- Class: Mammalia
- Order: Chiroptera
- Family: Phyllostomidae
- Genus: Vampyriscus
- Species: V. nymphaea

Binomial name
- Vampyriscus nymphaea Thomas, 1909

Synonyms
- Vampyressa nymphaea

= Vampyriscus nymphaea =

Species of bat

Vampyriscus nymphaea is a species of bat in the family Phyllostomidae, the leaf-nosed bats. It is known commonly as the striped yellow-eared bat. It is native to Colombia, Costa Rica, Ecuador, Nicaragua, Panama, and Honduras.
