= Ecuadorian sac-winged bat =

Conservation status
- Vulnerable (IUCN 3.1)

Scientific classification
- Kingdom: Animalia
- Phylum: Chordata
- Class: Mammalia
- Order: Chiroptera
- Family: Emballonuridae
- Genus: Balantiopteryx
- Species: B. infusca

Binomial name
- Balantiopteryx infusca (Thomas, 1897)
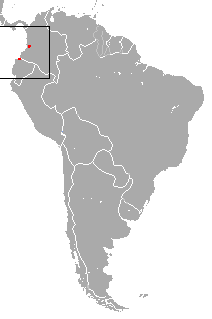
- Ecuadorian sac-winged bat range

Species of bat

The Ecuadorian sac-winged bat (Balantiopteryx infusca) is a species of sac-winged bat in the family Emballonuridae. It is found in Colombia and Ecuador. According to the IUCN Red List of Threatened Species, the population trend is decreasing for this species, due to habitat destruction through deforestation. In 2013, Bat Conservation International listed this species as one of the 35 species on its worldwide priority list for conservation.

== Taxonomy ==
Balantiopteryx infusca is the sister species of Balantiopteryx io and there are no recognised subspecies.

== Appearance ==
It is larger than Balantiopteryx io, and smaller than Balantiopteryx plicata. It lacks the white trim of Balantiopteryx plicata, and is darker in color.

== Habitat and behavior ==
It is found in the mouth of caves, abandoned mines, and cracks in rock. It prefers to live where there is plenty of light. The bats are sociable and live in colonies; they are also insectivorous.
