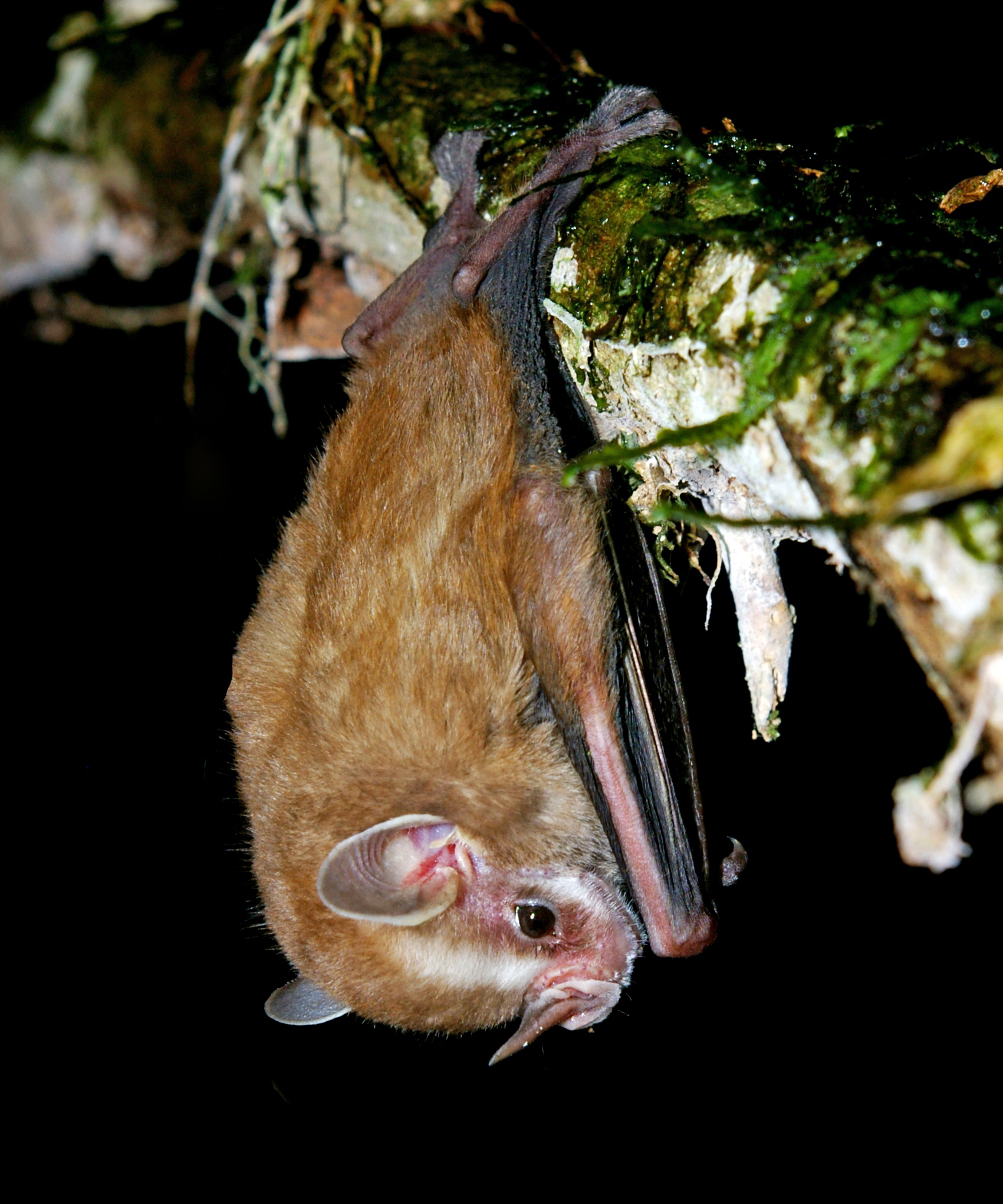

Conservation status
- Data Deficient (IUCN 3.1)

Scientific classification
- Kingdom: Animalia
- Phylum: Chordata
- Class: Mammalia
- Order: Chiroptera
- Family: Phyllostomidae
- Genus: Vampyressa
- Species: V. pusilla

Binomial name
- Vampyressa pusilla Wagner, 1843

= Southern little yellow-eared bat =

Species of bat

The southern little yellow-eared bat (Vampyressa pusilla) is a frugivorous bat species found in Brazil, Argentina and Paraguay.
