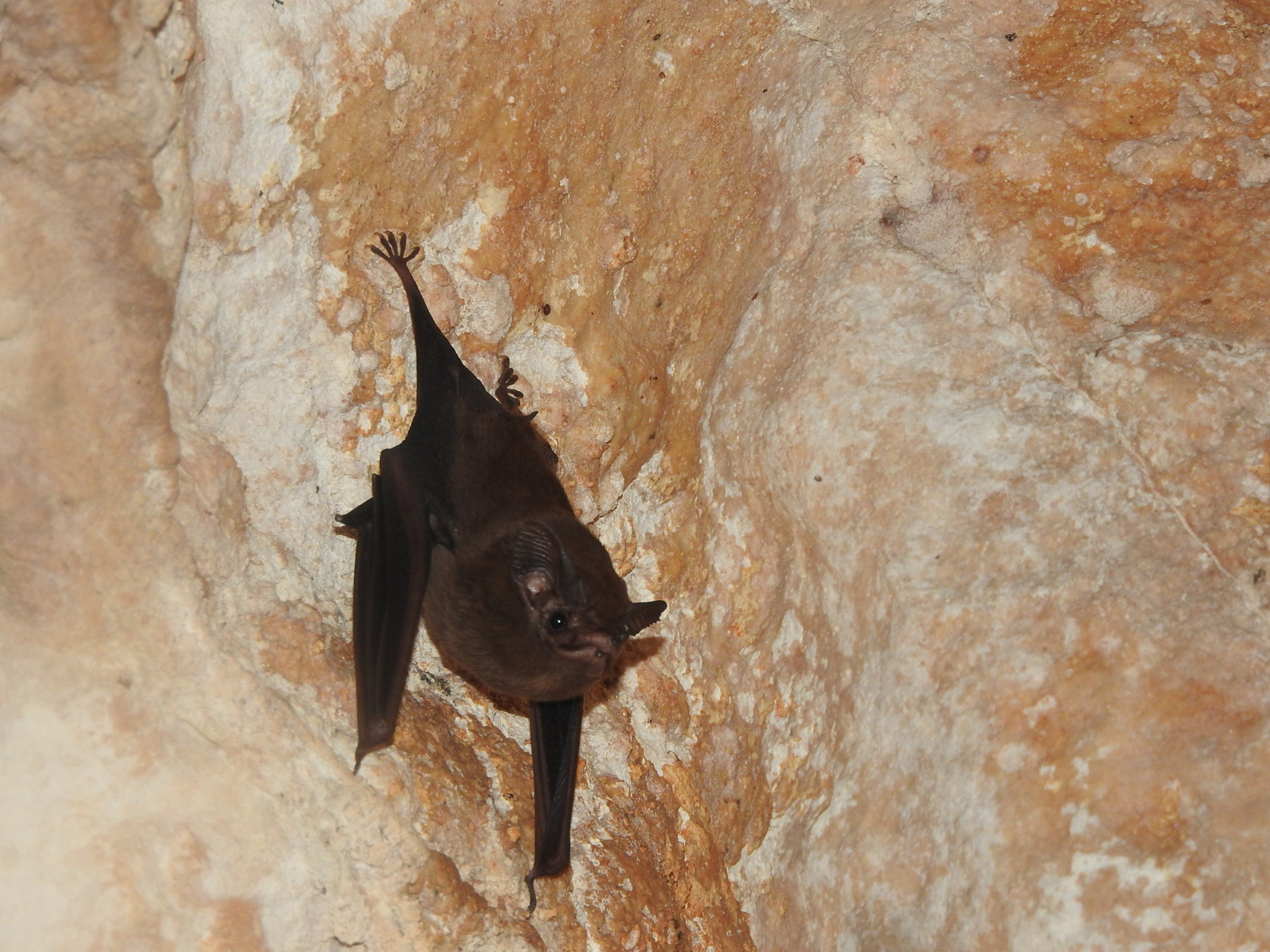

Conservation status
- Vulnerable (IUCN 3.1)

Scientific classification
- Kingdom: Animalia
- Phylum: Chordata
- Class: Mammalia
- Order: Chiroptera
- Family: Emballonuridae
- Genus: Balantiopteryx
- Species: B. io

Binomial name
- Balantiopteryx io Thomas, 1904
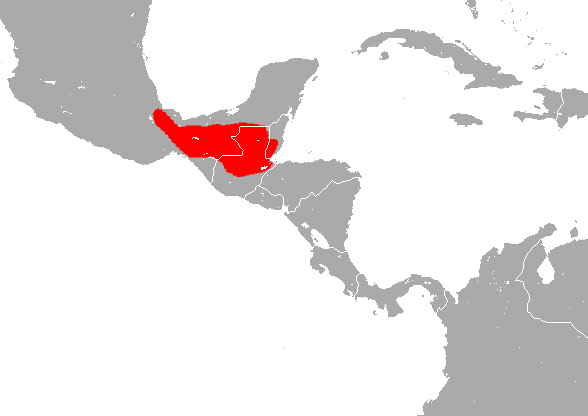
- Thomas's sac-winged bat range

= Thomas's sac-winged bat =

Species of bat

Thomas's sac-winged bat (Balantiopteryx io) is a species of sac-winged bat in the family Emballonuridae. It is found in Belize, Guatemala, and Mexico.

== Taxonomy ==
Oldfield Thomas named this bat in 1904. It is presumed that he named it after the Io found in Greek mythology, who was cursed by Hera to be eternally chased, because bats seem to be "flighty." Balantiopteryx io is a sister species of Balantiopteryx infusca and has no recognised subspecies.

== Appearance ==
It is the smallest species when compared to others in the genus Balantiopteryx, and lacks the white trim that is characteristic of Balantiopteryx plicata. The males weigh about 3.7 g, while the females weigh about 5 g.

== Biology and behavior ==
Thomas's sac-winged bat prefers to live in caves near the entrance, but there have been instances where they have been found deeper in the caves where it is darker. It has also been found in railroad tunnels. It likes to stay about nine inches or more away from the others when hanging on the ceiling. Groups of fifty or more of these bats can be found in a colony. It feeds on insects after sunset, so observing the bats is difficult. There is not much data available for this species' courting rituals, but what is known is that the female usually has one fetus, and the pregnant females can be found in March, April, May, and June.

== Conservation ==
The bat is considered "vulnerable" according to the IUCN redlist, and the population is decreasing. This assumption comes from the evidence of habitat destruction, and it has been estimated that about 30% of the bats' natural habitat has been destroyed by human causes such as vandalism, fires in caves, and tourism.
