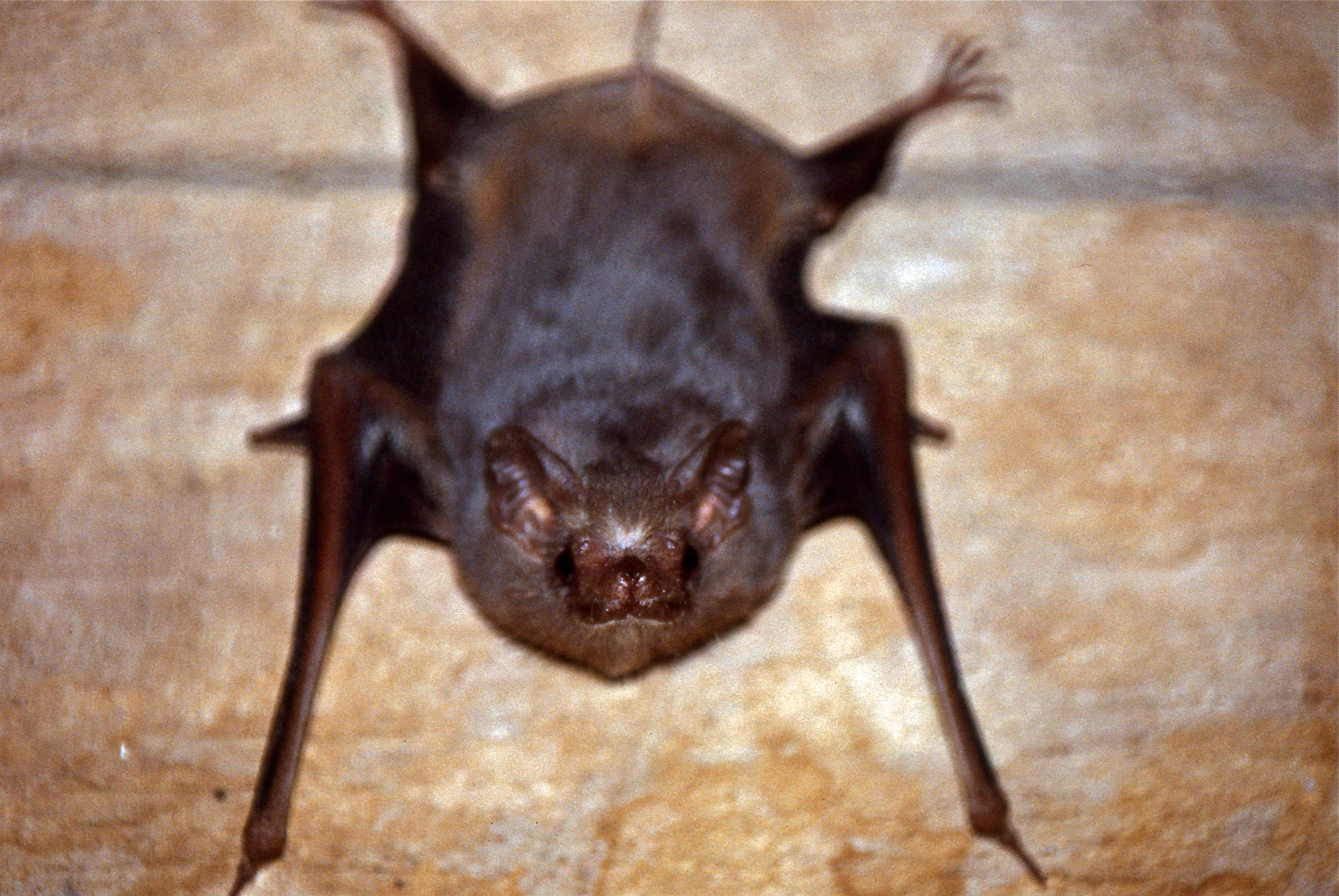

Scientific classification
- Domain: Eukaryota
- Kingdom: Animalia
- Phylum: Chordata
- Class: Mammalia
- Order: Chiroptera
- Family: Emballonuridae
- Genus: Balantiopteryx; Peters, 1867

Type species
- Balantiopteryx plicata Peters, 1867

Species
- Balantiopteryx infusca Balantiopteryx io Balantiopteryx plicata

= Balantiopteryx =

Genus of bats

Balantiopteryx is a genus of sac-winged bats. It comprises three species:

- Ecuadorian sac-winged bat - B. infusca
- Thomas's sac-winged bat - B. io
- Gray sac-winged bat - B. plicata
