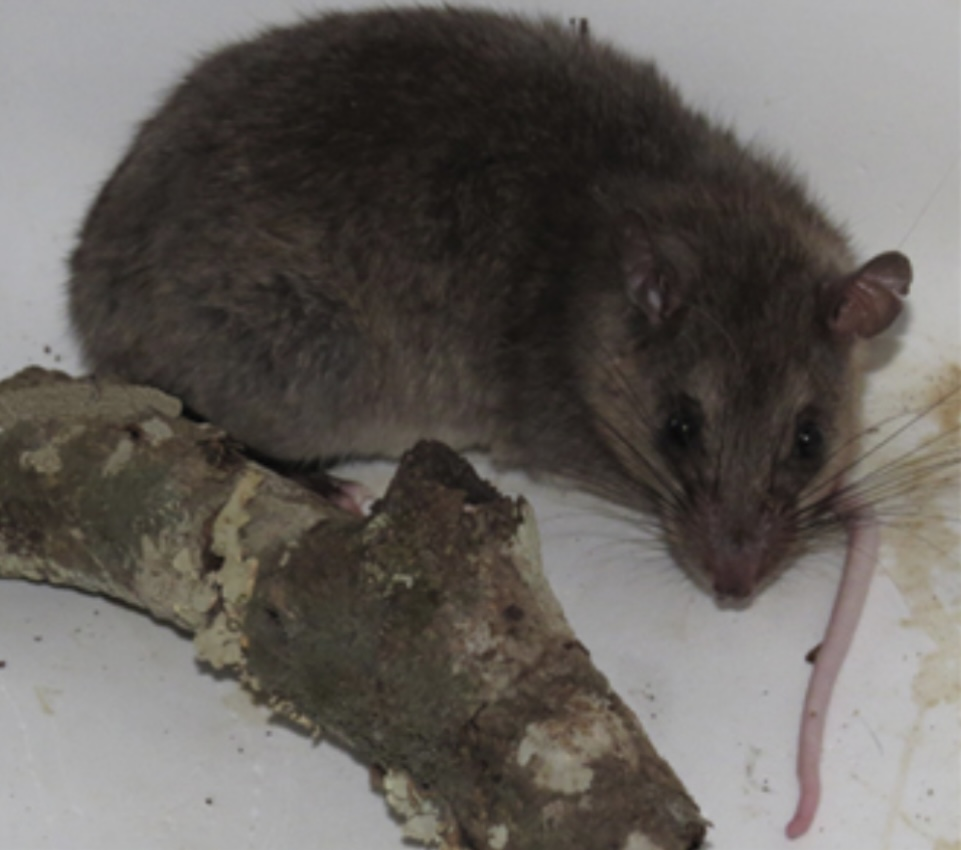

Conservation status
- Least Concern (IUCN 3.1)

Scientific classification
- Kingdom: Animalia
- Phylum: Chordata
- Class: Mammalia
- Order: Rodentia
- Family: Cricetidae
- Genus: Tylomys
- Species: T. mirae

Binomial name
- Tylomys mirae Thomas, 1899

= Mira climbing rat =

Species of rodent

The Mira climbing rat (Tylomys mirae) is a species of rodent in the family Cricetidae. It is found in Colombia and Ecuador.
