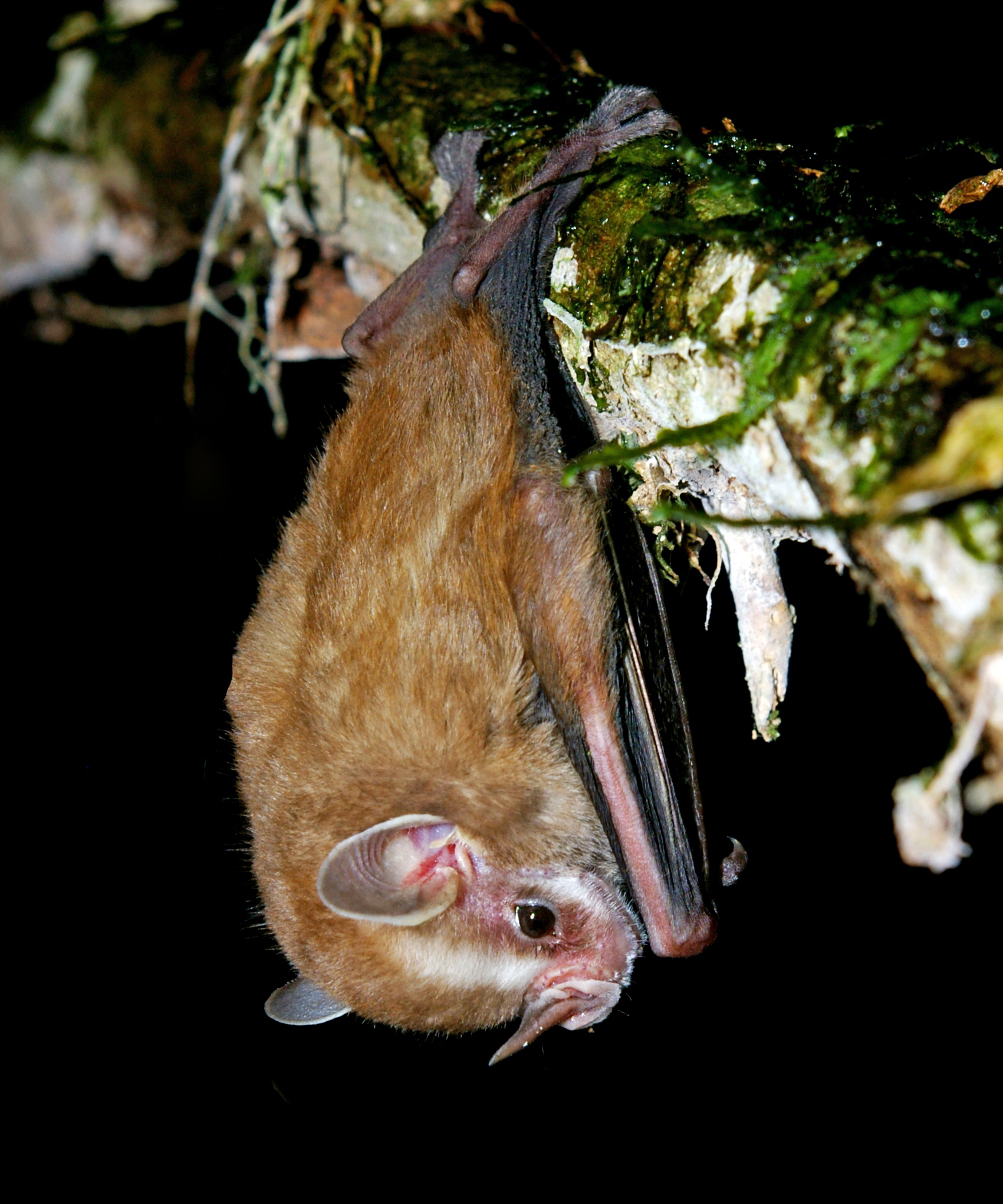
- Southern little yellow-eared bat (Vampyressa pusilla)

Scientific classification
- Kingdom: Animalia
- Phylum: Chordata
- Class: Mammalia
- Order: Chiroptera
- Family: Phyllostomidae
- Subfamily: Stenodermatinae
- Genus: Vampyressa; Thomas, 1900

Type species
- Phyllostoma pusillum Wagmer, 1843

= Vampyressa =

Genus of bats

Vampyressa is a genus of bats in the family Phyllostomidae, the leaf-nosed bats. They are known commonly as the yellow-eared bats.

There are five species. Three species were recently moved to the genus Vampyriscus. The two genera are differentiated by the morphology of their bones and teeth and the pattern of their pelage.

A molecular phylogeny using sequences of the cytochrome b gene showed that V. sinchi is a subspecies of V. melissa.

In 2024, a new species was described in México, based on morphological and molecular data. The new species, named Vampyressa villai, is similar to V. thyone but differs in DNA sequences and pelage and cranial characters. It is distributed west of the Isthmus of Tehuantepec.

Species include:

- Kalko's yellow-eared bat (Vampyressa elisabethae)
- Melissa's yellow-eared bat (Vampyressa melissa)
  - V. m melissa
  - V. m. sinchi
- Southern little yellow-eared bat (Vampyressa pusilla)
- Northern little yellow-eared bat (Vampyressa thyone)
- Villa's yellow-eared bat (Vampyressa villai)
- Voragine's yellow-eared bat (Vampyressa voragine)
