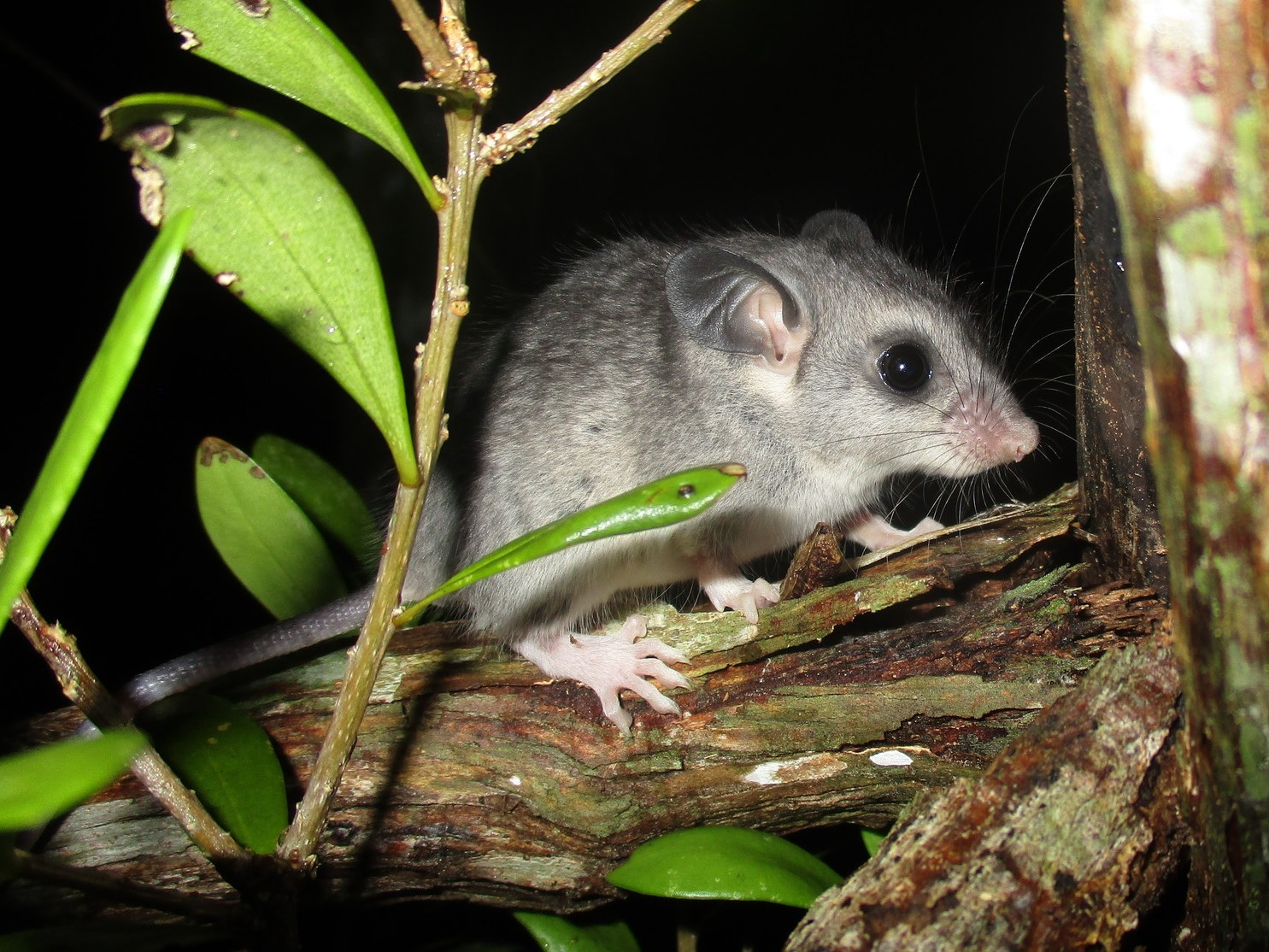

Conservation status
- Least Concern (IUCN 3.1)

Scientific classification
- Kingdom: Animalia
- Phylum: Chordata
- Class: Mammalia
- Order: Rodentia
- Family: Cricetidae
- Subfamily: Tylomyinae
- Tribe: Tylomyini
- Genus: Ototylomys; Merriam, 1901
- Species: O. phyllotis

Binomial name
- Ototylomys phyllotis Merriam, 1901

= Big-eared climbing rat =

Species of rodent

The big-eared climbing rat (Ototylomys phyllotis) is a species of rodent in the family Cricetidae. It is found in Central America from Mexico to Costa Rica.

== Description ==
The big-eared climbing rat is in the order Rodentia and in the family Cricetidae and is most widely distributed species in the genus Ototylomys. A second species of the genus was described in 2017 from the Mexican state of Chiapas. The genus dates back 3.35 Mya, prior to the Great American Biotic Interchange and Its initial occurrence was near Honduras and El Salvador.

Ototylomys is Greek for otus (ear), tylos (knob, knot, swelling), and mus (mouse), which describes the animal's large ears and shelf-like skull.

The big-eared climbing rat is a slender rat with two colors; dark on top of its body and light below. Its eyes and ears are large. It has large naked ears and a long naked tail with scales. Its size and color varies depending on where it lives geographically but most populations have a creamy white underbelly except for those in Mexico and Guatemala, which have a slate-colored underbelly. The skull is flat on top and has a prominent interparietal bone and supraorbital ridges There is no sexual dimorphism in this species.

== Phylogeny ==
The genus Ototylomys is most closely related to Tylomys. They both are known as climbing rats that are endemic to Central America. They both have flattened braincases, elongated skulls, highly developed supraorbital ridges and incisive foramina. They also have similar reproductive glands. They differ in many traits some being that Ototylomys are smaller with larger ears. They also have a larger auditory bullae, their rostrum is narrower, and their baculum is longer and narrower compared to its size.

== Distribution and habitat ==
This species ranges from Mexico to Costa Rica.

== Diet ==
The diet of the big-eared climbing rat is incomplete, though it mostly consists of fruit and leaves. Dietary requirements remain poorly understood, as big-eared climbing rats housed in laboratories have lost their tails due to malnutrition.

== Behavior ==
Big-eared climbing rats are arboreal and nocturnal and they are seen both on the ground and in the trees. Their copulatory behavior is peculiar in that there is a copulatory lock.

== Physiology ==
There does not seem to be a regular estrous cycle. The gestation length of the big-eared climbing rat is 52 days. Delayed implantation may occur in this species. The females exhibit post-partum estrus and the litter size may vary from 1-4.

From birth, newborns have been observed to be very advanced for their age. They chased their mothers almost from birth and by day 2 they are already 50% of the adults body length and respond to loud noises. By day 6 they open their eyes and they cling to their mothers teats for 30 days. Timing of sexual maternity varies within this species.

The big-eared climbing rat has been a subject of study due to a disease caused by Leishmania mexicana. This is an intracellular parasite that infects these rodents and makes them a good model choice for further research on this topic.
