= Chiapan climbing rat =

Conservation status
- Critically endangered, possibly extinct (IUCN 3.1)

Scientific classification
- Kingdom: Animalia
- Phylum: Chordata
- Class: Mammalia
- Order: Rodentia
- Family: Cricetidae
- Genus: Tylomys
- Species: T. bullaris

Binomial name
- Tylomys bullaris Merriam, 1901

Species of rodent

The Chiapan climbing rat (Tylomys bullaris) is a species of rodent in the family Cricetidae. It is found only in Mexico. The species is known from only one location in Tuxtla Gutiérrez, Chiapas. The habitat in the region is being converted to agricultural and urban use, which is likely causing critical declines in numbers of T. bullaris.
