= Tumbala climbing rat =

Conservation status
- Critically Endangered (IUCN 3.1)

Scientific classification
- Kingdom: Animalia
- Phylum: Chordata
- Class: Mammalia
- Order: Rodentia
- Family: Cricetidae
- Genus: Tylomys
- Species: T. tumbalensis

Binomial name
- Tylomys tumbalensis Merriam, 1901

Species of rodent

The Tumbala climbing rat (Tylomys tumbalensis) is a species of rodent in the family Cricetidae. It is found in Mexico, where it is known only from one locality in Tumbalá, Chiapas. The species is threatened by deforestation.
