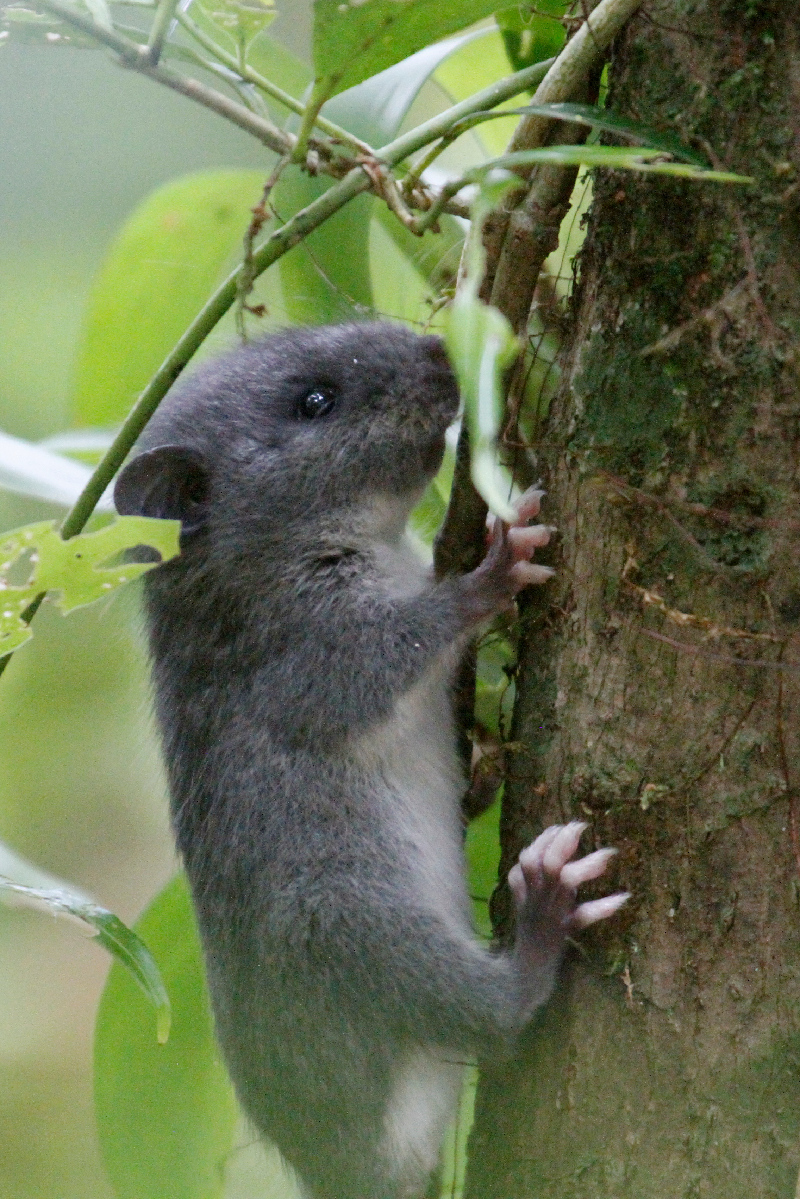

Conservation status
- Least Concern (IUCN 3.1)

Scientific classification
- Kingdom: Animalia
- Phylum: Chordata
- Class: Mammalia
- Order: Rodentia
- Family: Cricetidae
- Genus: Tylomys
- Species: T. watsoni

Binomial name
- Tylomys watsoni Thomas, 1899

= Watson's climbing rat =

Species of rodent

Watson's climbing rat (Tylomys watsoni) is a species of rodent in the family Cricetidae. It is found in Costa Rica and Panama.
