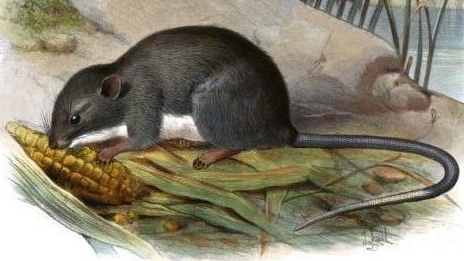

Conservation status
- Data Deficient (IUCN 3.1)

Scientific classification
- Kingdom: Animalia
- Phylum: Chordata
- Class: Mammalia
- Order: Rodentia
- Family: Cricetidae
- Genus: Tylomys
- Species: T. panamensis

Binomial name
- Tylomys panamensis (Gray, 1873)

= Panamanian climbing rat =

Species of rodent

The Panamanian climbing rat (Tylomys panamensis) is a species of rodent in the family Cricetidae. It is endemic to Panama.

== Literature cited ==
- Alston, E. R. 1882. Biologia centrali-americana. Mammalia. R.H. Porter, 220 pp.
- Musser, G. G. and M. D. Carleton. 2005. Superfamily Muroidea. pp. 894–1531 in Mammal Species of the World a Taxonomic and Geographic Reference. D. E. Wilson and D. M. Reeder eds. Johns Hopkins University Press, Baltimore.
