= Fulvous-bellied climbing rat =

Conservation status
- Data Deficient (IUCN 3.1)

Scientific classification
- Kingdom: Animalia
- Phylum: Chordata
- Class: Mammalia
- Order: Rodentia
- Family: Cricetidae
- Genus: Tylomys
- Species: T. fulviventer

Binomial name
- Tylomys fulviventer Anthony, 1916

Species of rodent

The fulvous-bellied climbing rat (Tylomys fulviventer) is a species of rodent in the family Cricetidae. It is found only in Panama.

== Sources ==
- Musser, G. G. and M. D. Carleton. 2005. Superfamily Muroidea. pp. 894–1531 in Mammal Species of the World a Taxonomic and Geographic Reference. D. E. Wilson and D. M. Reeder eds. Johns Hopkins University Press, Baltimore.
