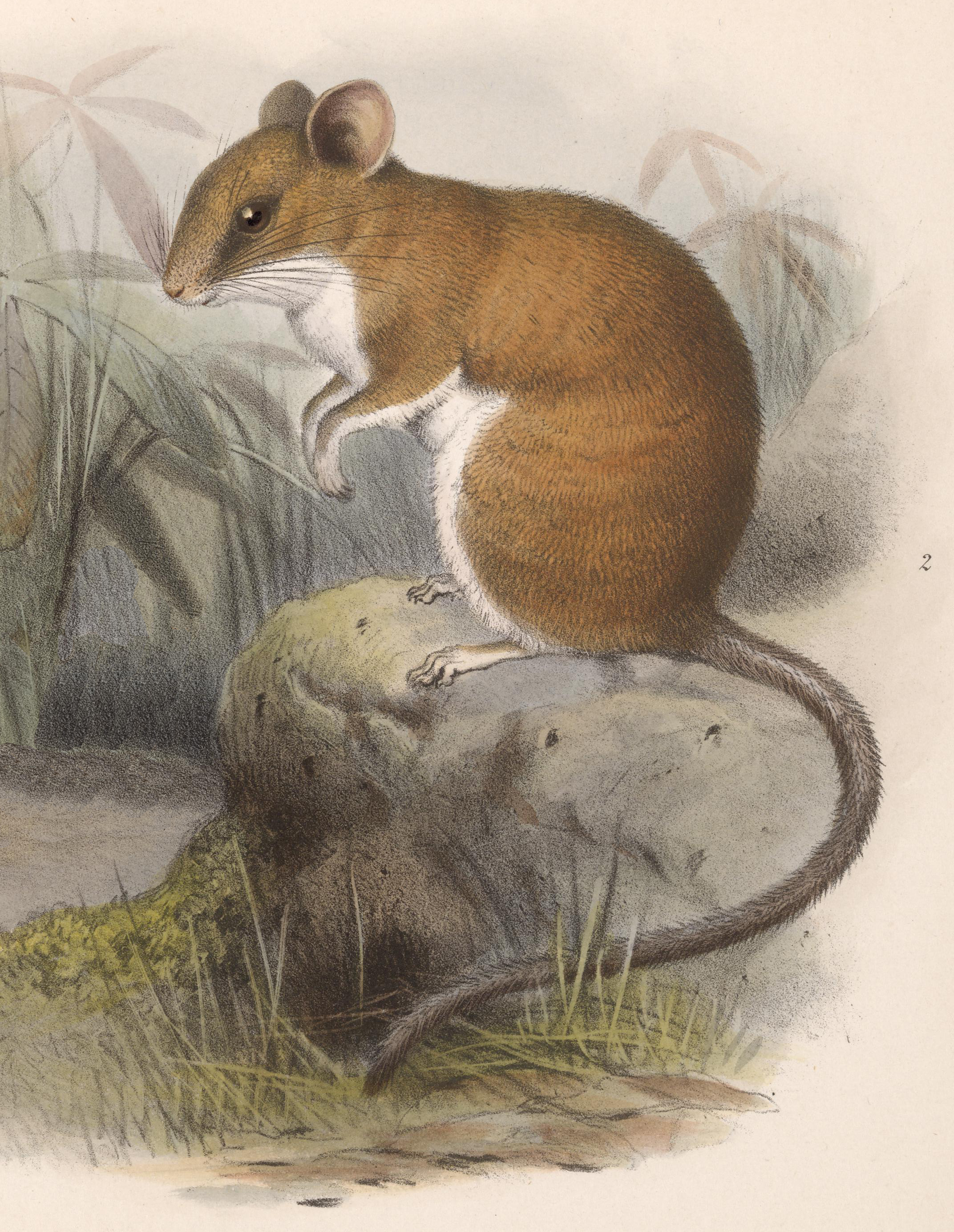
- Nyctomys sumichrasti

Conservation status
- Least Concern (IUCN 3.1)

Scientific classification
- Kingdom: Animalia
- Phylum: Chordata
- Class: Mammalia
- Order: Rodentia
- Family: Cricetidae
- Genus: Nyctomys; Saussure, 1860
- Species: N. sumichrasti

Binomial name
- Nyctomys sumichrasti (Saussure, 1860)
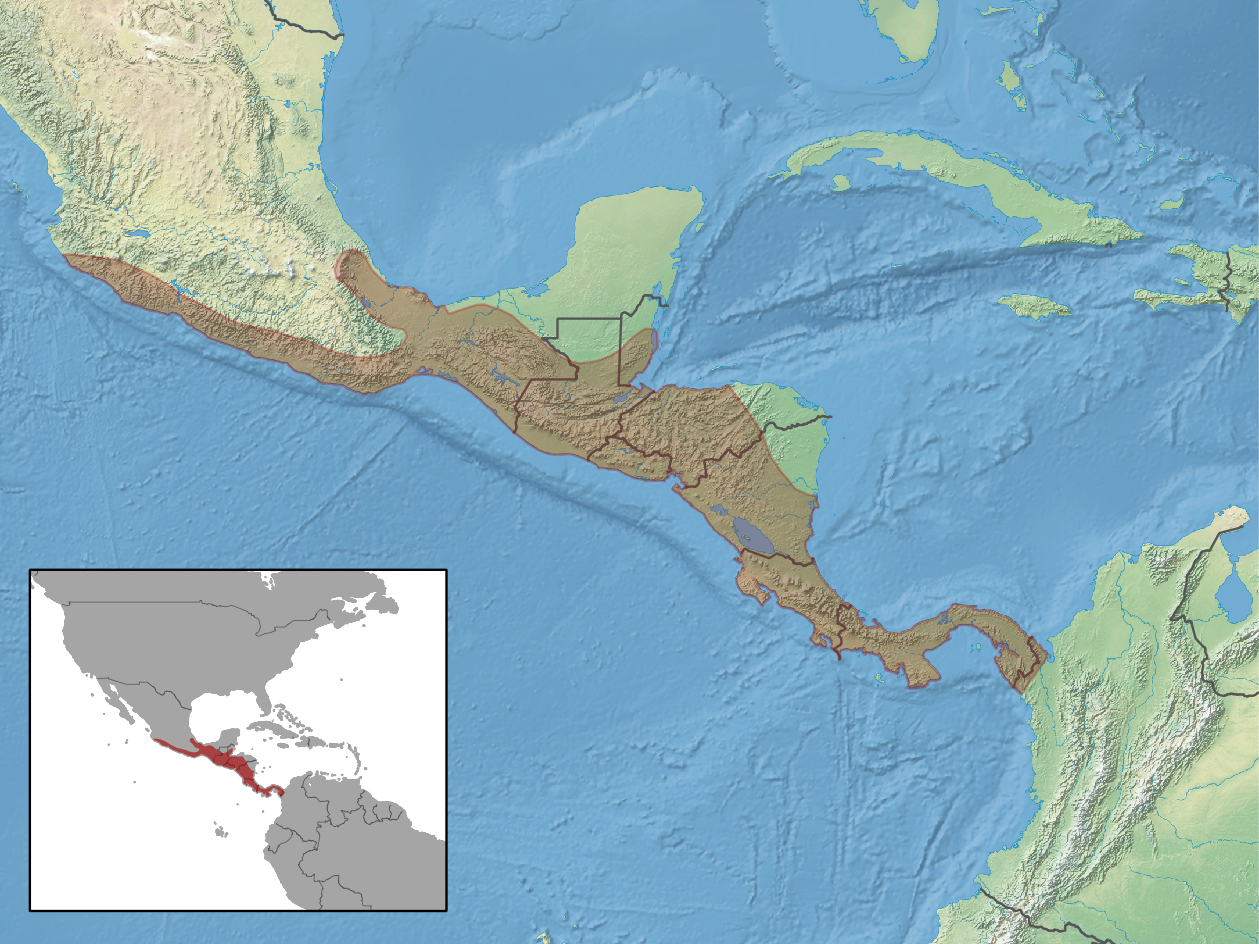

= Sumichrast's vesper rat =

Species of rodent

Sumichrast's vesper rat (Nyctomys sumichrasti) is a rodent of the family Cricetidae found from southern Mexico to Panama. It is named for François Sumichrast, the collector of the first specimen, and its closest relative is probably Hatt's vesper rat, a similar, but slightly smaller, species from the Yucatán Peninsula.

== Description ==
Sumichrast's vesper rat is a relatively small rat, with an adult length of 10 to 13 cm (3.9 to 5.1 in), not including the tail, which is only slightly shorter. Males and females are of similar size, with both weighing between 220 to 245 g (7.8 to 8.6 oz). It is one of the more brightly coloured rats, with a reddish or orange back and creamy to white underparts. The rats have a thick pelt of soft fur, which extends over the entire length of the tail, and is absent only on the soles of the feet. The eyes are relatively large, and surrounded by a narrow ring of black hair, while the whiskers are long and the ears small.

To aid in climbing, the claws are compressed and curved, and the first toe on each foot is thumb-like.

== Distribution and subspecies ==
Sumichrast's vesper rat is found from southern Jalisco and Veracruz in Mexico through much of Central America, excluding the Yucatan, as far east as central Panama. It occurs in evergreen and semi-deciduous forests throughout this range, at elevations from sea level to as high as 1,600 m (5,250 ft). A total of nine subspecies are currently recognised:

- N. s. sumichrasti - southern Veracruz, Mexico
- N. s. colimensis - Jalisco to Oaxaca, Mexico
- N. s. costaricensis - southern Costa Rica
- N. s. decolorus - southern Belize and eastern Guatemala to Honduras
- N. s. florencei - southern Honduras and western Nicaragua
- N. s. nitellinus - eastern Costa Rica to central Panama
- N. s. pallidulus - southern Tabasco and western Chiapas
- N. s. salvini - eastern Chiapas and southern Guatemala
- N. s. venustulus - eastern Nicaragua

== Biology and behaviour ==
Sumichrast's vesper rat is unusual in that it is arboreal, and builds nests of twigs and leaves. They rarely travel along the ground, preferring to remain in the middle and upper parts of the forest canopy, between 3 and 22 m (9.8 and 72.2 ft) high. They build their nests in tree hollows or in the forks of branches, constructing an irregular mass of material with a hollow central cavity about 10 cm (3.9 in) across, often building them on top of older nests so that a series of multiple layers builds up over time.

It is nocturnal and herbivorous, eating fruits and seeds, although it has been reported to eat a small number of moths. Favoured foods include figs, and the seeds of plants such as Jacquinia pungens and borage. In Costa Rica, they have also been observed to eat the poisonous leaves of the plant Daphnopsis americana, although avoiding the central part of the leaf, and selecting only young leaves. They follow established paths along branches in search of food, and have a home range of about 70 m (230 ft) across. Although they move slowly when compelled to travel along the ground, and make slow deliberate movements while feeding or grooming, they are agile in the trees, moving rapidly and constantly twitching their whiskers and ears.

Under laboratory conditions, the rats remain in family groups of mated pairs, but are intolerant of any strangers, often attacking them. They have been observed to make high-pitched, musical chirps and trills, while males sometimes make lower pitched grunts towards established mates.

== Reproduction ==
Mating occurs throughout the year. Gestation lasts from 30 to 38 days and results in the birth of one to three young. The young are reared in a nest constructed by both parents, although the male usually remains outside the nest for the first seven days after birth. The young are about 8 cm (3.1 in) long at birth, and weigh 4.5 g (0.16 oz). They are initially blind and only partially furred, and remain attached to the mother's teats for most of their first two weeks, although they are able to crawl from two days of age. They are weaned at around three weeks, and their eyes open after fifteen to eighteen days.

The rats become sexually mature at around 75 days of age, and have lived for up to five years in captivity.
