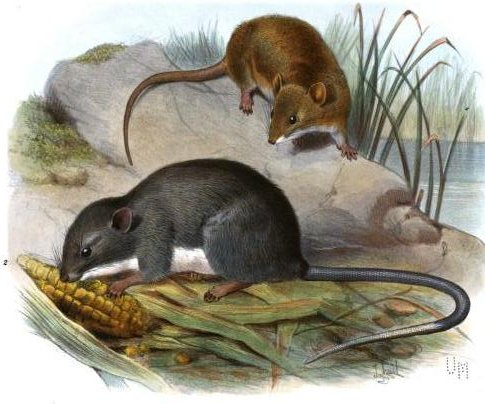
- Tylomys panamensis (lower left).

Scientific classification
- Domain: Eukaryota
- Kingdom: Animalia
- Phylum: Chordata
- Class: Mammalia
- Order: Rodentia
- Family: Cricetidae
- Tribe: Tylomyini
- Genus: Tylomys; Peters, 1866

Species
- Tylomys bullaris Tylomys fulviventer Tylomys mirae Tylomys nudicaudus Tylomys panamensis Tylomys tumbalensis Tylomys watsoni

= Tylomys =

Genus of rodents

Tylomys is a genus of rodent in the family Cricetidae. It contains the following species:

- Chiapan climbing rat (Tylomys bullaris)
- Fulvous-bellied climbing rat (Tylomys fulviventer)
- Mira climbing rat (Tylomys mirae)
- Peters's climbing rat (Tylomys nudicaudus)
- Panamanian climbing rat (Tylomys panamensis)
- Tumbala climbing rat (Tylomys tumbalensis)
- Watson's climbing rat (Tylomys watsoni)
