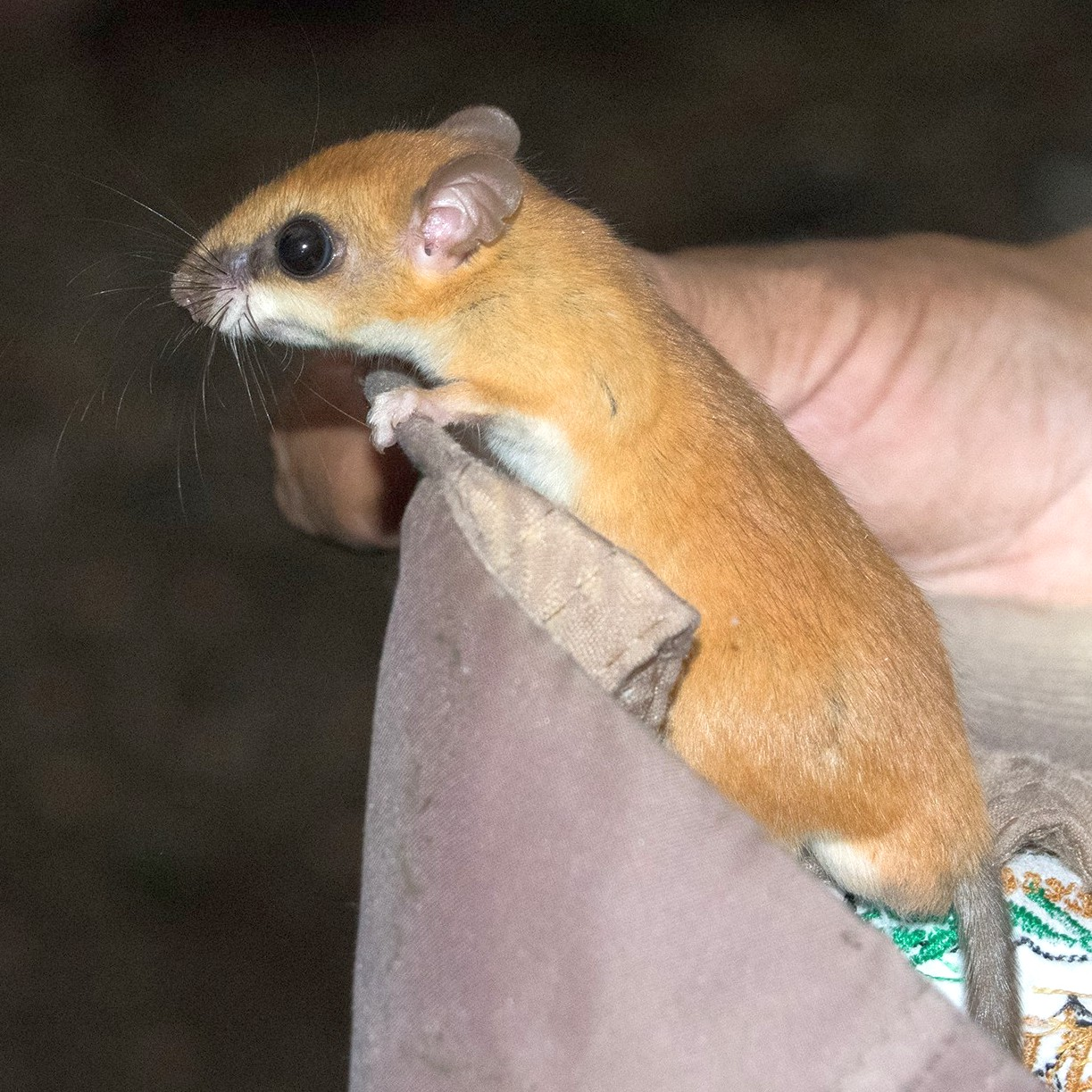

Conservation status
- Least Concern (IUCN 3.1)

Scientific classification
- Kingdom: Animalia
- Phylum: Chordata
- Class: Mammalia
- Order: Rodentia
- Family: Cricetidae
- Genus: Otonyctomys; Anthony, 1932
- Species: O. hatti

Binomial name
- Otonyctomys hatti Anthony, 1932
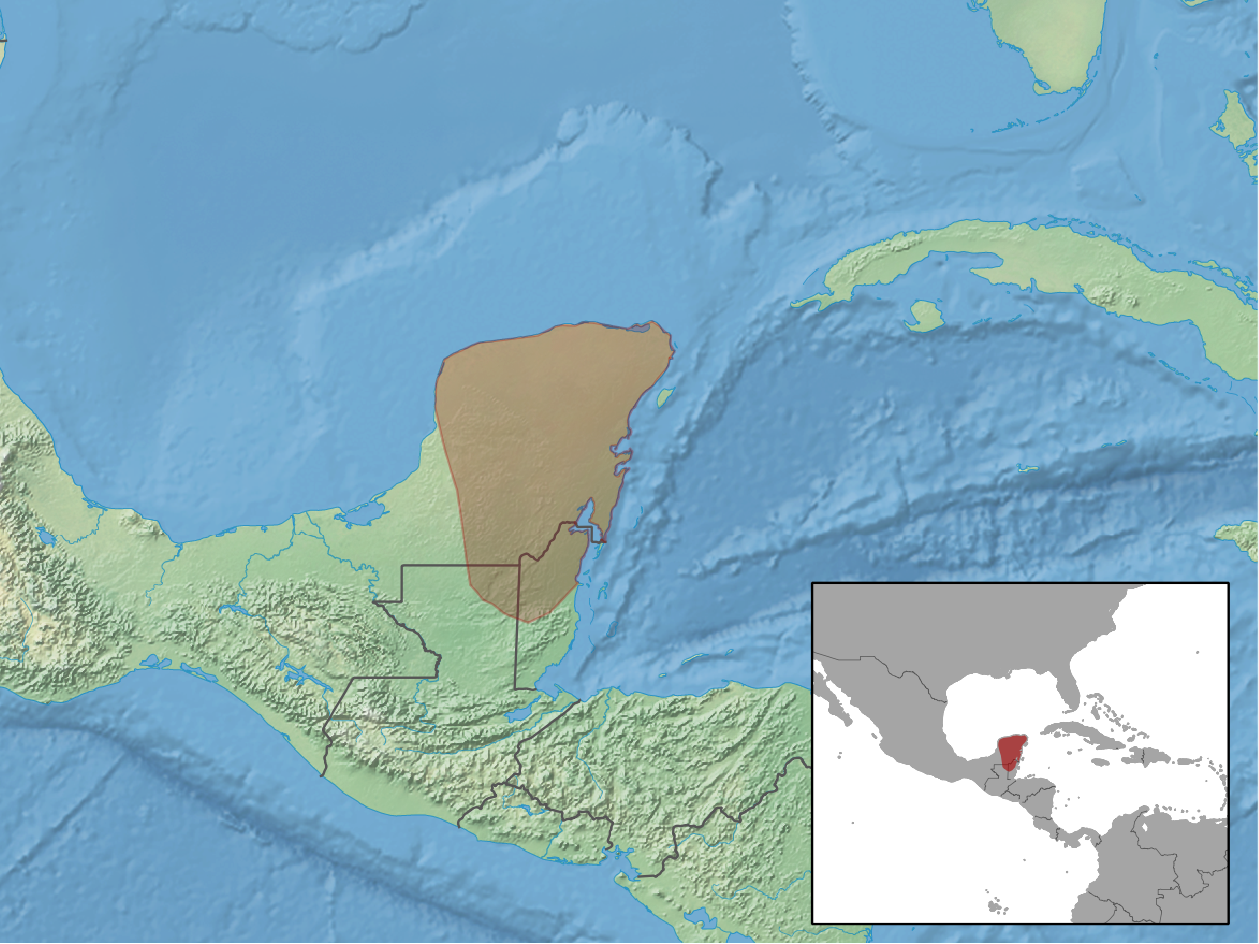

= Hatt's vesper rat =

Species of rodent in the family Cricetidae

Hatt's vesper rat (Otonyctomys hatti), also known as Hatt's vesper mouse or Yucatán vesper rat, is a species of rodent in the family Cricetidae. It is the only species in the genus Otonyctomys. It is named for its discoverer, Robert T. Hatt.

== Description ==
Hatt's vesper rat has a typical rat-like appearance, and closely resembles the related Sumichrast's vesper rat, from which it can most easily be distinguished by its much larger auditory bullae. It is relatively small for a rat, both sexes having a head body length of 9 to 12 centimetres (3.5 to 4.7 in), and a long, 6 to 13 centimetres (2.4 to 5.1 in), tail. Adults weigh from 23 to 36 grams (0.81 to 1.27 oz).

The rat is brightly coloured, with bright russet or yellowish fur over most of the body, and creamy or white underparts. The face has a short, rounded snout, and conspicuous black markings in front of the eyes, stretching as far as the whiskers. Younger individuals tend to be duller in colour, and have less glossy fur than the adults. The tail is thickly covered with brown fur along its entire length, although the ears are largely hairless. Females have four abdominal teats.

== Distribution and habitat ==
Hatt's vesper rat is found throughout the Yucatán Peninsula, in the Mexican states of Campeche, Yucatán, and Quintana Roo, and in northern Guatemala and Belize. It inhabits broadleaf tropical forests close to water and below about 250 metres (820 ft) elevation. It has generally been recorded in trees or lianas, on fallen wood, or even in the rafters of houses, and may be largely arboreal in its habits.

== Biology ==
The rat is little studied, and, as of 2008, was known only from eighteen specimens. It appears to be nocturnal, and herbivorous, eating seeds and fruit, and to spend much of its time in the trees. The breeding season, if it has a specific one, is unknown, although one specimen caught in February was a lactating female. It is listed as a threatened species in Mexico, but is considered of least concern by the IUCN because of its apparently wide distribution and adaptability. Fossil specimens have been discovered dating back to the Pleistocene.
