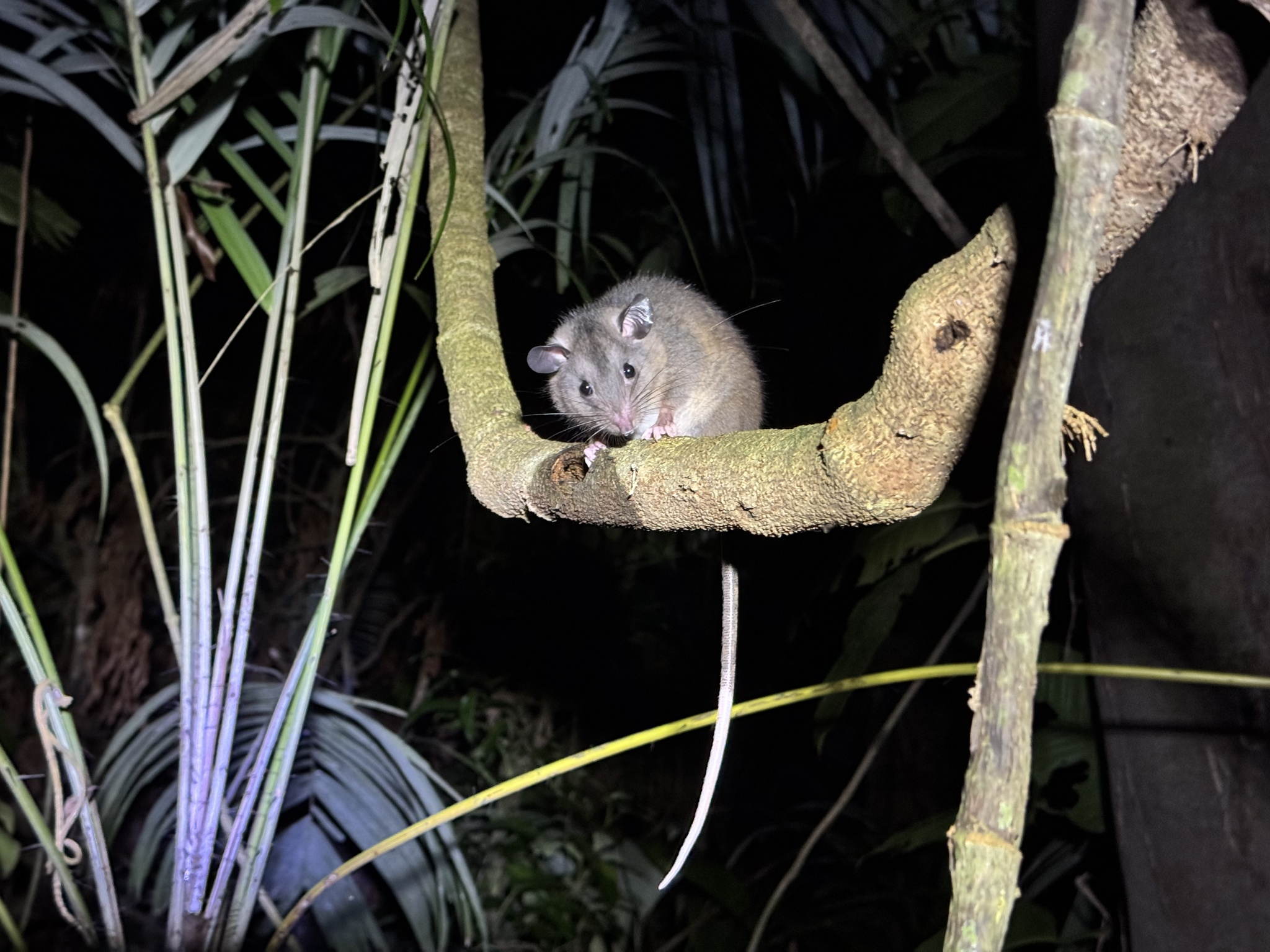
- Tylomys nudicaudus on a tree in the Los Tuxtlas Biosphere Reserve, Mexico.

Conservation status
- Least Concern (IUCN 3.1)

Scientific classification
- Kingdom: Animalia
- Phylum: Chordata
- Class: Mammalia
- Order: Rodentia
- Family: Cricetidae
- Genus: Tylomys
- Species: T. nudicaudus

Binomial name
- Tylomys nudicaudus (Peters, 1866)

= Peters's climbing rat =

Species of rodent

Peters's climbing rat (Tylomys nudicaudus) is a species of rodent in the family Cricetidae.

It is found in Belize, El Salvador, Guatemala, Honduras, Mexico, and Nicaragua.
