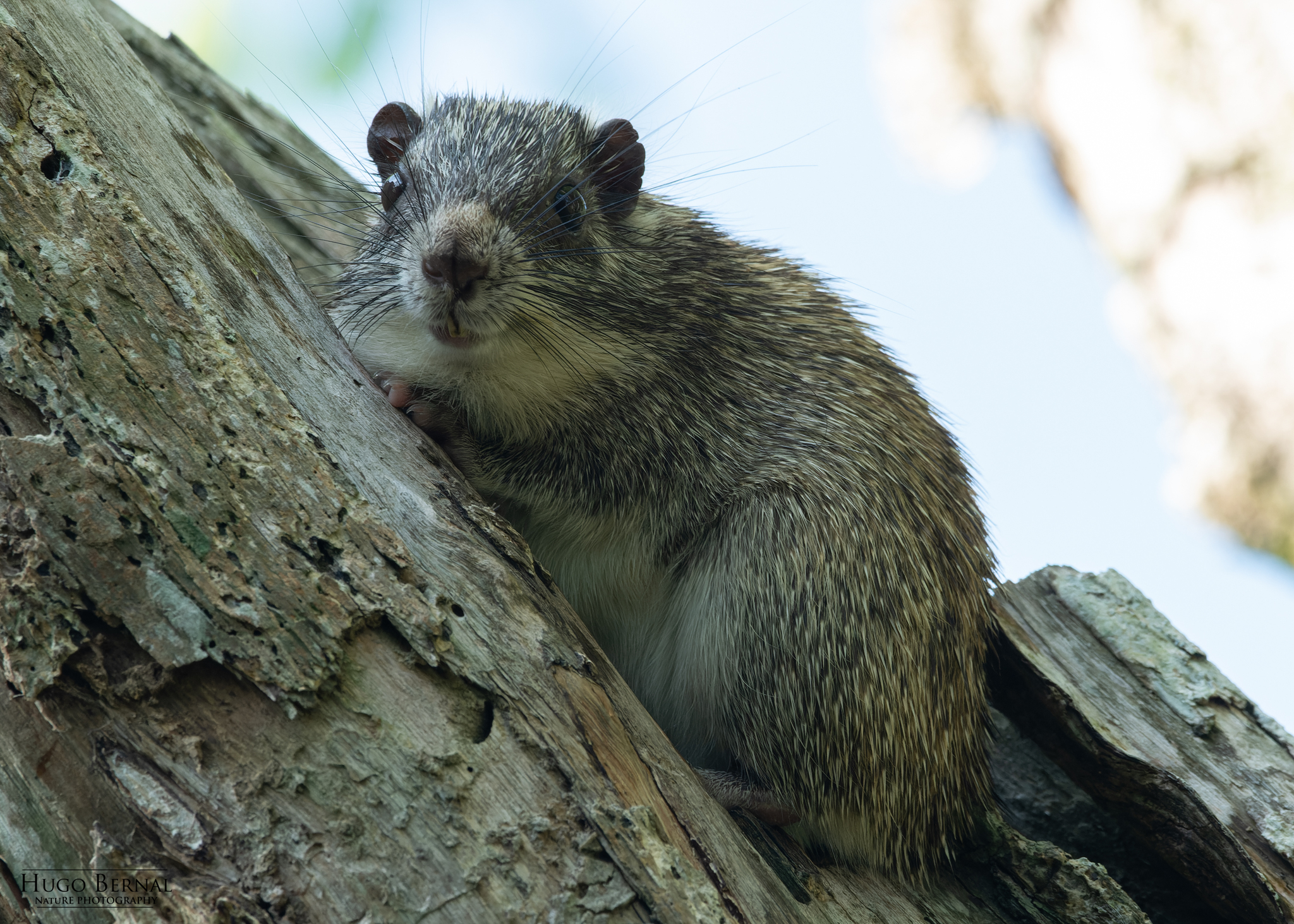
- Sabana de Torres, Santander, Colombia

Conservation status
- Least Concern (IUCN 3.1)

Scientific classification
- Kingdom: Animalia
- Phylum: Chordata
- Class: Mammalia
- Infraclass: Placentalia
- Order: Rodentia
- Family: Echimyidae
- Genus: Pattonomys
- Species: P. semivillosus

Binomial name
- Pattonomys semivillosus (I. Geoffroy, 1838)
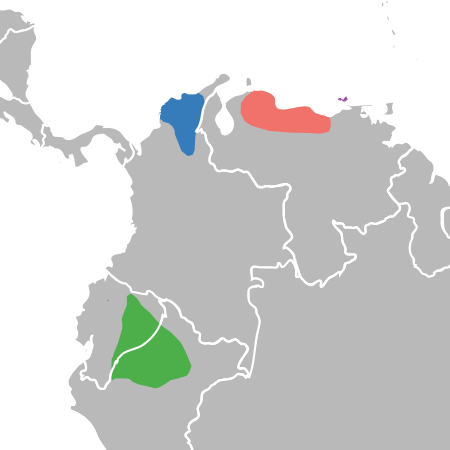
- Pattonomys distribution P. semivillosus in blue

Synonyms
- Nelomys semivillosus I. Geoffroy, 1838; Loncheres semivillosus Lesson, 1842; Loncheres semivillosa J. A. Wagner, 1843; Echimys semivillosus Trouessart, 1904; Makalata semivillosus G. E. Iack-Ximenes, de Vivo, & Percequillo, 2005

= Speckled spiny tree-rat =

Species of rodent

The speckled spiny tree-rat (Pattonomys semivillosus), also known as the Colombian speckled tree-rat, is a species of rodent in the family Echimyidae. It is found in the swampy ciénegas of northeastern Colombia and northwestern Venezuela. It can be found in gallery forests, dry forests and mangrove forests. Its diet includes fruit and seeds.

== Taxonomy and etymology ==
The speckled spiny tree-rat was first described in 1838 by Isidore Geoffroy Saint-Hilaire, a French zoologist. He placed the species in the genus Nelomys and gave it the species name semivillosus, which pertains to the common name "semivillose nelomys". The word "villose" originates from the Latin villōsus, 'shaggy'. The description was based on three specimens sent by the French consul from the type locality "Carthagène (Nouvelle Grenade)" (present-day Cartagena, Colombia). Of the three specimens Geoffroy Saint-Hillaire examined, the location of only one is still known, that being the syntype placed in the National Museum of Natural History, France. Only a skull without the mandible is remaining from this specimen. The species was clarified as belonging to the genus Pattonomys in 2006.

As part of the genus Pattonomys, it is closely related to the giant tree-rat (Toromys grandis) and other members of the genus Toromys. The recently described species Pattonomys carrikeri and P. punctatus have a disjunct distribution from P. semivillosus and are considered more genetically distant, almost as much as is Toromys. The speckled spiny tree-rat has a notably high number of chromosomes, at 2n=94. It has no subspecies.

Genus-level cladogram of the Echimyini

- Echimyini
  - Isothrix
  - - "Eumysopines"
      - Lonchothrix
        (Tuft-tailed spiny tree-rat)
      - Mesomys
    - - - - Pattonomys
          - Toromys
            (Giant tree-rat)
        - - Makalata
          - - Echimys
            - Phyllomys
      - - - Diplomys
          - Santamartamys
            (Red-crested tree-rat)
        - "Dactylomyines"
          - Kannabateomys
            (Atlantic bamboo rat)
          - - Dactylomys
            - Olallamys

The cladogram has been reconstructed from mitochondrial and nuclear DNA characters.

== Description ==
The adult speckled spiny tree-rat is of medium size, having a head-body length ranging from 20 to 27 centimeters (7.9 to 11 inches), plus a tail that is 2.1 to 2.6 cm (0.8 to 1 in) long. It weighs between 194 and 407 grams (6.8 and 14 ounces). Its fur is pale gray to brown along the back, mixed to a yellow-buff, ocher, or black color along the middle. Along its sides, the tree-rat is sometimes grayish, though the flanks may carry the same color as the back. Its underside may be grayish, white, or pale orange. The small ears are pale but covered by fine black hairs along the edge. Near the base of the ear, at the antitragus, a tuft of white fur is visible. The muzzle and throat is notably white and contrasts against the rest of the head, which is grizzled gray towards the sides and black overall. Past the head and towards the tail, white-tipped guard hairs cover the tree-rat's body. The tail, which usually measures between 80 and 120% of the tree-rat's body length, is covered in short hairs. The broad hind feet have robust claws and are gray to yellow-gray on top.

The skull of the speckled spiny tree-rat is short and narrow towards the face or rostrum. Narrow bony ledges appear around the eye sockets at the brow ridge above the eyes. The rat's incisors are white, and the openings behind them in the hard palate—the incisive foramina—are narrow. The hollow structures encasing the inner and middle ear, the auditory bullae, are somewhat large. Compared to other members of Pattonomys, the speckled spiny tree-rat has a narrower skull overall.

== Habitat and distribution ==
Speckled spiny tree-rats are found only in the drainage area of the lower Magdalena River of northeastern Columbia. They may also be found in parts of northwestern Venezuela. They occur at elevations of up to 600 meters (2,000 feet).

The species is tree-dwelling and will make dens in tree holes. Preferred habitats of the speckled spiny tree-rat include moist areas of lowland thorn forests and swampy ciénegas. The species is sometimes found in rainforests, and more frequently found in gallery forests and dry forests. In the Llanos of northwestern South America, it may be found in trees. Some speckled spiny tree-rats are found in the mangrove forests of Salamanca Island Road Park.

== Ecology and behavior ==
The speckled spiny tree-rat is nocturnal. It is presumed to be herbivorous, eating fruits and seeds, though specific food items are unknown. Nothing is known of its social structure or reproductive habits.

== Conservation ==
There are no known major threats to the speckled spiny tree-rat. It is common within its range. The International Union for Conservation of Nature lists it as a least-concern species, citing its large population, wide distribution, and lack of evidence that populations are declining at an appreciable rate. In their account of the species written in 2016, authors Pierre-Henri Fabre, Jim Patton, and Yuri Leite noted that additional studies on the speckled spiny tree-rat's ecology, habitat, and potential conservation threats were needed, as next to nothing was known about these subjects.
