= Spiny tree-rat =

Spiny tree-rats are all found in the rodent family Echimyidae. They are found in the following genera:

- Echimys
- Lonchothrix
- Mesomys
- Makalata
- Pattonomys
