= Montane bamboo rat =

Conservation status
- Data Deficient (IUCN 3.1)

Scientific classification
- Kingdom: Animalia
- Phylum: Chordata
- Class: Mammalia
- Order: Rodentia
- Family: Echimyidae
- Genus: Dactylomys
- Species: D. peruanus

Binomial name
- Dactylomys peruanus J. A. Allen, 1900
- Montane bamboo rat range

Species of rodent

The montane bamboo rat or Peruvian bamboo rat (Dactylomys peruanus), is a species of rodent in the family Echimyidae. It is found in Bolivia and Peru. Its natural habitat is subtropical or tropical moist lowland forests.
