= Louise H. Emmons =

Zoologist specialist of Neotropical mammals

- Born: 23 August 1943 (age 83); Montevideo, Uruguay
- Known for: The 307-page opus Neotropical Rainforest Mammals: A Field Guide
- Scientific career
- Fields: Zoologist
- Workplaces: National Museum of Natural History at the Smithsonian Institution

Louise H. Emmons is an American zoologist who studies tropical rainforest mammals, especially rodents. She has conducted fieldwork in Gabon, Sabah (Borneo), Peru, and Bolivia. Her best known work is the field guide, Neotropical Rainforest Mammals: A Field Guide, first published in 1990, with a second edition in 1997.

== Education ==
Louise Hickok Emmons earned her PhD from Cornell University in 1975 and wrote a thesis entitled, "Ecology and Behavior of African Rainforest Squirrels." She received a B.A. from Sarah Lawrence College in 1965.

== Description of new taxa ==
Louise H. Emmons described several new taxa of mammals:

- three genera of spiny rats, Callistomys, in 1998, and Pattonomys and Santamartamys, in 2005.
- one genus and one species of abrocomid, Cuscomys ashaninka, in 1999.
- one species of spiny rat, Phyllomys pattoni, in 2002.
- two species of oryzomyine rodents, Oryzomys acritus, in 2005, and Oecomys sydandersoni, in 2009.
- one species of rat, Pithecheirops otion, in 1993.
- one species of didelphid marsupial, Monodelphis gardneri, in 2012.

She also introduced the new taxon name Olallamys for a genus of spiny rats.

== Taxonomic patronym ==
In honor of Louise H. Emmons, one taxonomic patronym was given for a rodent with the species name emmonsae:

- Euryoryzomys emmonsae, the Emmons's rice rat.
- Pampamys emmonsae, the Emmons's extinct spiny rat

== Books ==
- 2002. Tupai: A field study of treeshrews in Borneo. Berkeley: University of California Press.
- 2000. Tupai: A field study of Bornean Treeshrews. Berkeley: University of California Press.
- Emmons, Louise H. and Feer, François. 1999. Mamíferos de los bosques húmedos de América tropical: Una guía de campo. Santa Cruz, Bolivia: Editorial F.A.N.
- Emmons, Louise H., Whitney, B., and Ross, D. 1998. Sounds of Neotropical rainforest mammals: An audio field guide. Ithaca: Cornell Laboratory of Natural Sounds.
- Emmons, Louise H. and Feer, François. 1997. Neotropical rainforest mammals: A field guide. Chicago: University of Chicago Press.
- Emmons, Louise H. and Feer, François. 1990. Neotropical rainforest mammals: A field guide. Chicago: University of Chicago Press.
