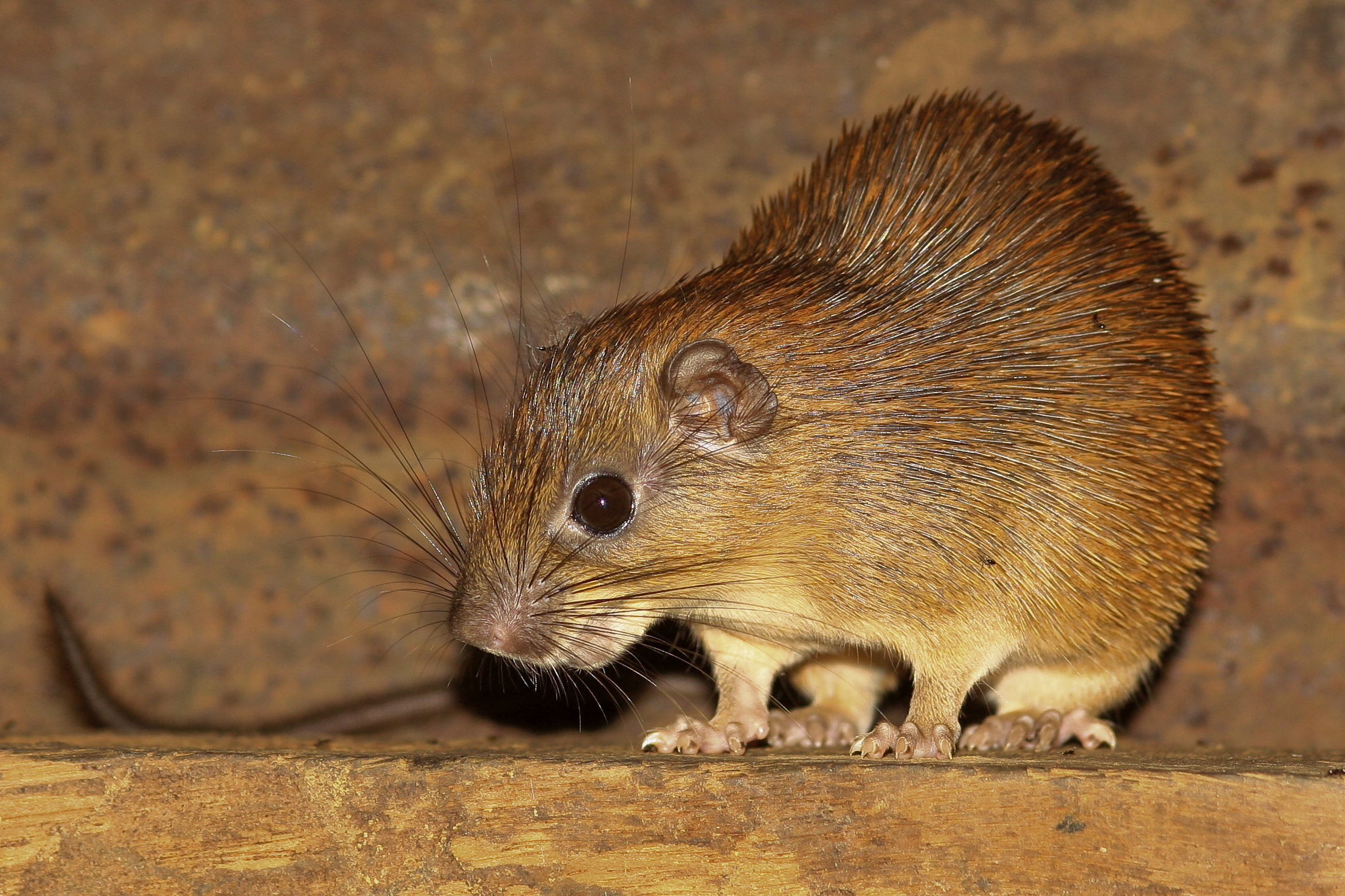
- Mesomys hispidus

Scientific classification
- Kingdom: Animalia
- Phylum: Chordata
- Class: Mammalia
- Order: Rodentia
- Superfamily: Octodontoidea
- Family: Echimyidae
- Subfamily: Echimyinae
- Tribe: Echimyini; Fabre et al. 2016

Genera
- Dactylomys; Diplomys; Echimys; Isothrix; Kannabateomys; Lonchothrix; Makalata; Mesomys; Olallamys; Pattonomys; Phyllomys; Santamartamys; Toromys

= Echimyini =

Tribe of mammals in the spiny rat family of rodents

Echimyini is a tribe of echimyid rodents, proposed in 2016, and containing 13 extant genera: all of the tree rats Echimys, Phyllomys, Makalata, Pattonomys, Toromys, Diplomys, Santamartamys, and Isothrix, the long recognized dactylomines Dactylomys, Olallamys, and Kannabateomys, and the enigmatic and previously classified as eumysopines Lonchothrix and Mesomys. All these spiny rats genera are arboreal. Worth of note, the arboreal genus Callistomys – the painted-tree rat – does not belong to the tribe Echimyini. Because it is phylogenetically closer to Myocastor, Hoplomys, Proechimys, and Thrichomys than to the above-mentioned Echimyini genera, it is classified in the tribe Myocastorini.

== Phylogeny ==
Five assemblages can be distinguished in the genus-level cladogram of Echimyini:

- Echimys is closely related to Phyllomys, Makalata, Pattonomys and Toromys. This clade is in accordance with the fact that Phyllomys was classified within Echimys, and that Pattonomys and Toromys were placed in Makalata.
- Dactylomys, Olallamys, and Kannabateomys share unique features, and these South American bamboo rats are grouped under the informal clade name of "Dactylomyines".
- Diplomys and Santamartamys are a sister group, reflecting the fact that the latter genus has been split from the former.
- Lonchothrix and Mesomys are a sister group, and have often been classified within "Eumysopines", a subfamily otherwise shown to be polyphyletic.
- Isothrix occupies an isolated, deep-branching position.

Genus-level cladogram of the Echimyini.

- Echimyini
  - Isothrix
  - - "Eumysopines"
      - Lonchothrix
        (Tuft-tailed spiny tree-rat)
      - Mesomys
    - - - - Pattonomys
          - Toromys
            (Giant tree-rat)
        - - Makalata
          - - Echimys
            - Phyllomys
      - - - Diplomys
          - Santamartamys
            (Red-crested tree-rat)
        - "Dactylomyines"
          - Kannabateomys
            (Atlantic bamboo rat)
          - - Dactylomys
            - Olallamys

The cladogram has been reconstructed from mitochondrial and nuclear DNA characters.
