= Bare-tailed armored tree-rat =

Conservation status
- Data Deficient (IUCN 3.1)

Scientific classification
- Kingdom: Animalia
- Phylum: Chordata
- Class: Mammalia
- Infraclass: Placentalia
- Order: Rodentia
- Family: Echimyidae
- Genus: Pattonomys
- Species: P. occasius

Binomial name
- Pattonomys occasius (Thomas, 1921)
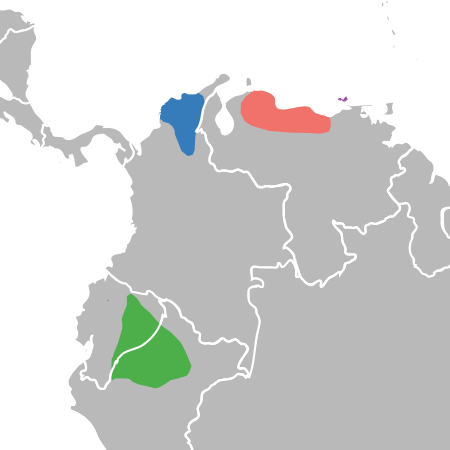
- Pattonomys distribution P. occasius in green

Synonyms
- Echimys occasius Thomas, 1921; Makalata occasius (Thomas, 1921)

Species of rodent

The bare-tailed armored tree-rat (Leiuromys occasius) is a species of arboreal rodent in the family Echimyidae. It is found in lowland tropical rainforest east of the Andes in Ecuador and Peru. In 2018, it was recommended that the species be moved to the monotypic genus Leiuromys. Prior to this year it had been variously considered a member of the genera Echimys, Makalata, and Pattonomys.
