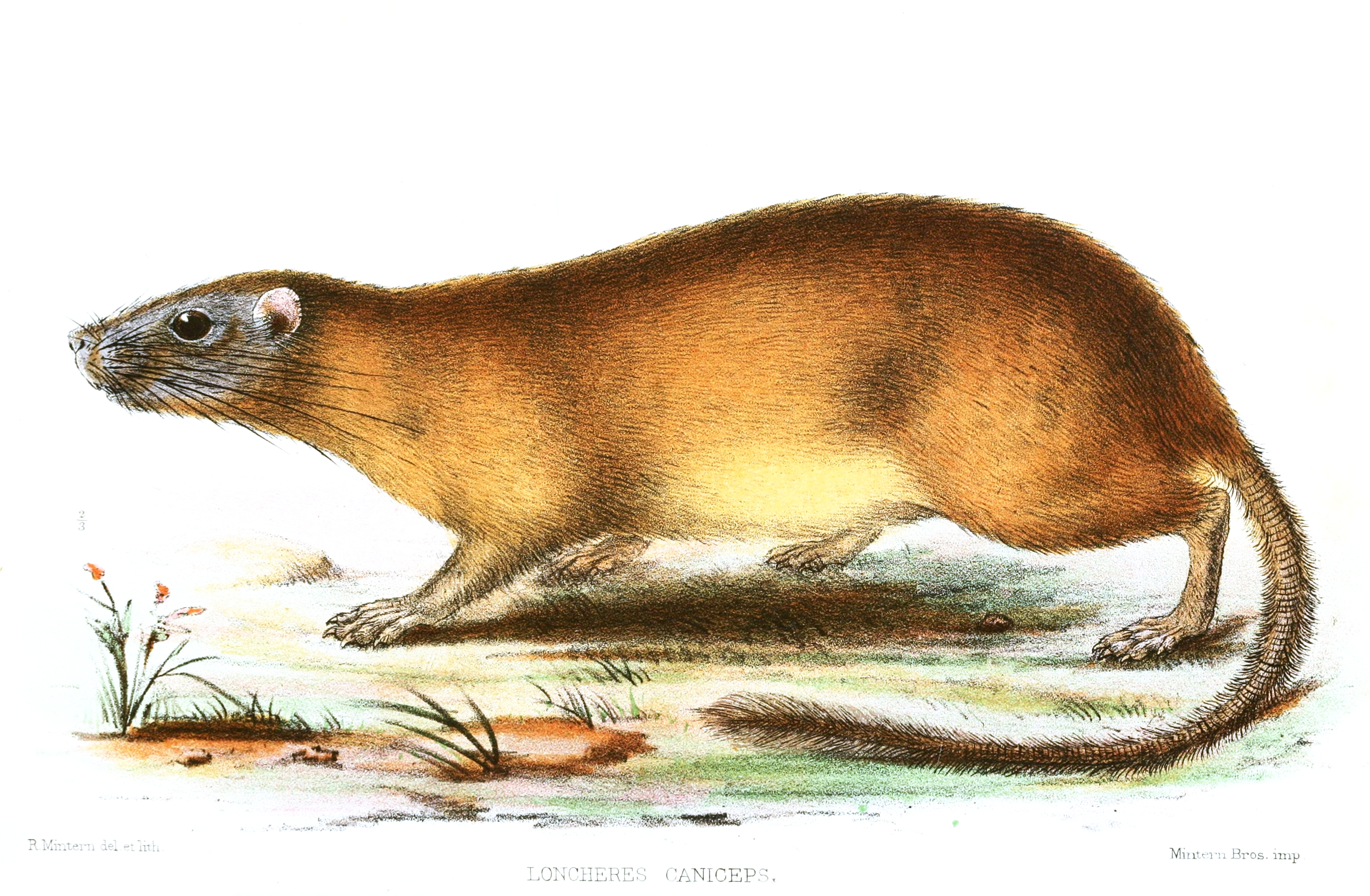

Conservation status
- Data Deficient (IUCN 3.1)

Scientific classification
- Kingdom: Animalia
- Phylum: Chordata
- Class: Mammalia
- Order: Rodentia
- Family: Echimyidae
- Genus: Diplomys
- Species: D. caniceps

Binomial name
- Diplomys caniceps (Günther, 1877)
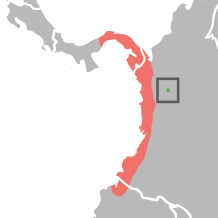
- Diplomys distribution D. caniceps in green (in box)

Synonyms
- Loncheres caniceps Günther, 1877

= Colombian soft-furred spiny rat =

Colombian soft-furred spiny-rat

Species of rodent

The Colombian soft-furred spiny-rat (Diplomys caniceps), or arboreal soft-furred spiny-rat, is a species of rodent in the family Echimyidae. It is found in Colombia. Its natural habitat is subtropical or tropical moist lowland forests.
