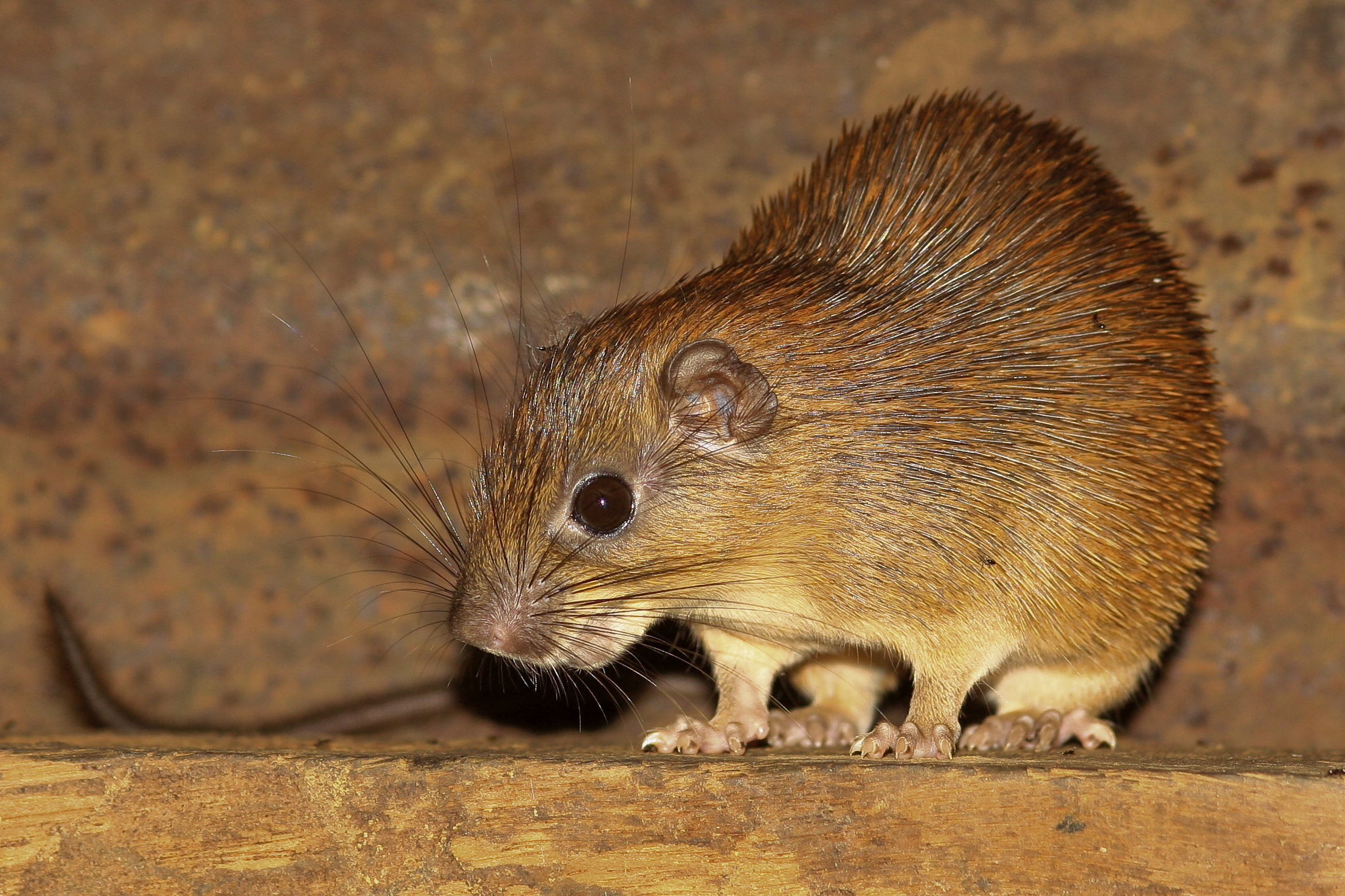
- Mesomys hispidus

Conservation status
- Least Concern (IUCN 3.1)

Scientific classification
- Kingdom: Animalia
- Phylum: Chordata
- Class: Mammalia
- Order: Rodentia
- Family: Echimyidae
- Subfamily: Echimyinae
- Tribe: Echimyini
- Genus: Mesomys
- Species: M. hispidus

Binomial name
- Mesomys hispidus (Desmarest, 1817)
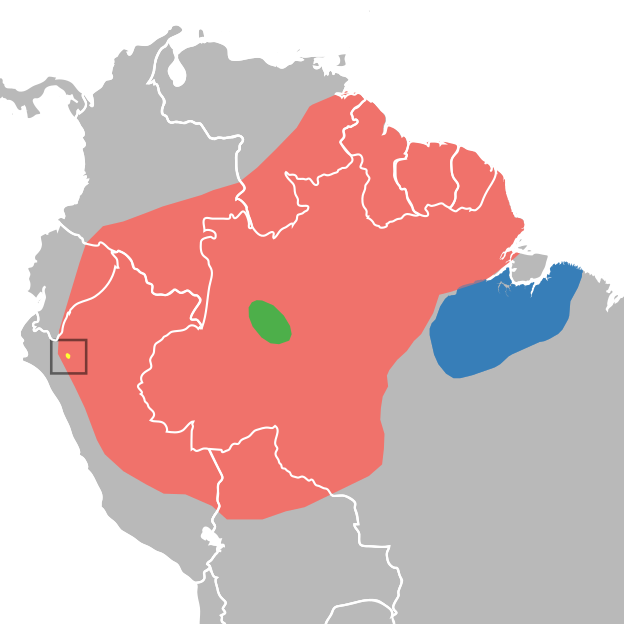
- Mesomys distribution M. hispidus in red

= Ferreira's spiny tree-rat =

Species of rodent

Ferreira's spiny tree-rat (Mesomys hispidus) is a spiny rat species found in Bolivia, Brazil, Colombia, Ecuador, French Guiana, Guyana, Peru, Suriname and Venezuela. The etymology of the species name corresponds to the Latin word hispidus meaning bristly.

== Systematics ==
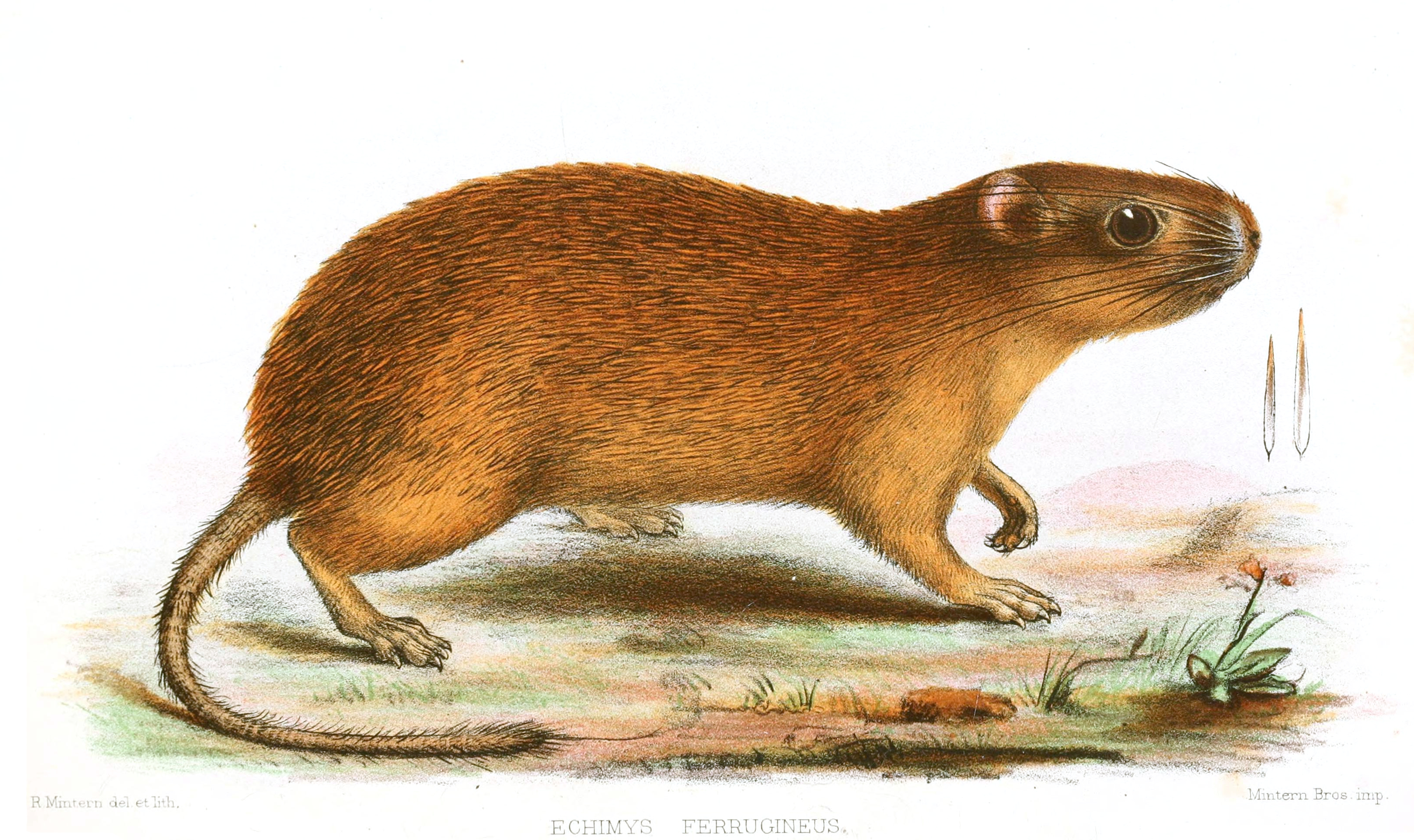
Illustration, 1876

The description of Mesomys hispidus was conducted on a specimen collected by the naturalist Alexandre Rodrigues Ferreira during his travels in Amazonian Brazil, hence the species name. Initially deposited in the Museu Real d'Ajuda of Portugal, it has been brought to Paris in 1808 after the plundering of Lisbon by the armies of Napoleon. Then, in 1817, Anselme Gaëtan Desmarest described the species based on this specimen housed in the National Museum of Natural History (France) of Paris.

Using ancient DNA technology, a portion of the mitochondrial cytochrome b gene has been sequenced from a small skin fragment of this holotype. DNA sequence comparisons then suggested that the specimen was originally obtained in eastern Amazonia north of the Amazon River, most likely in the Brazilian state of Amapá.
