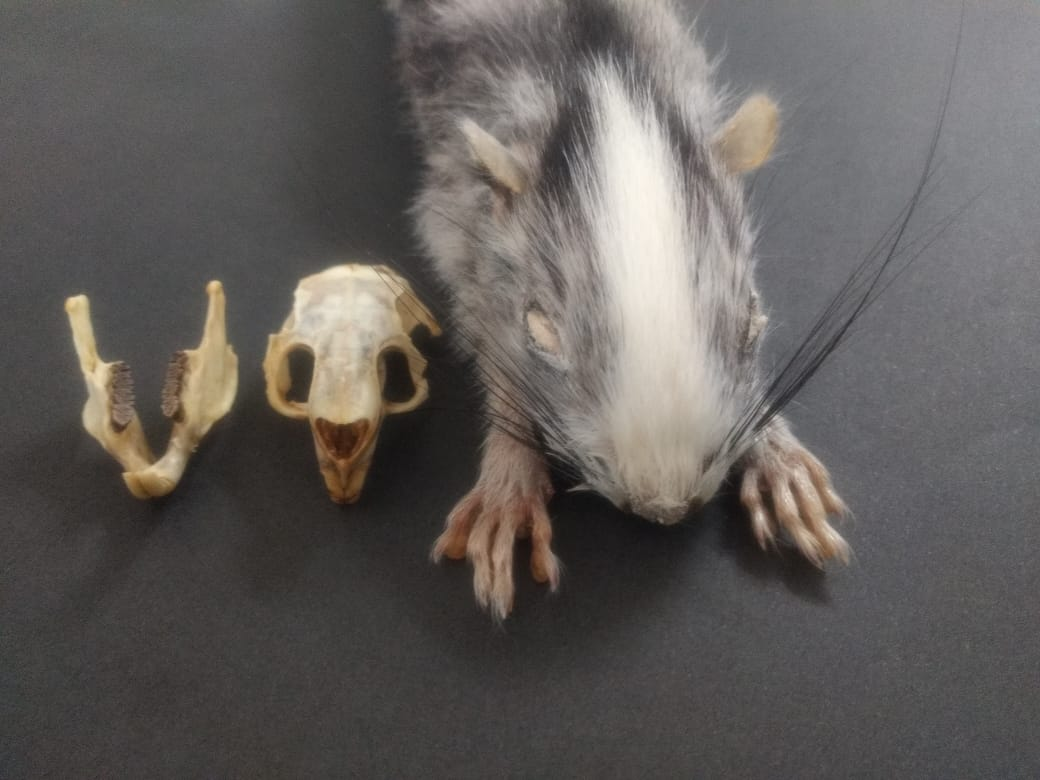

Conservation status
- Endangered (IUCN 3.1)

Scientific classification
- Kingdom: Animalia
- Phylum: Chordata
- Class: Mammalia
- Infraclass: Placentalia
- Order: Rodentia
- Family: Echimyidae
- Subfamily: Echimyinae
- Tribe: Myocastorini
- Genus: Callistomys; Emmons & Vucetich, 1998
- Species: C. pictus

Binomial name
- Callistomys pictus (Pictet, 1841)
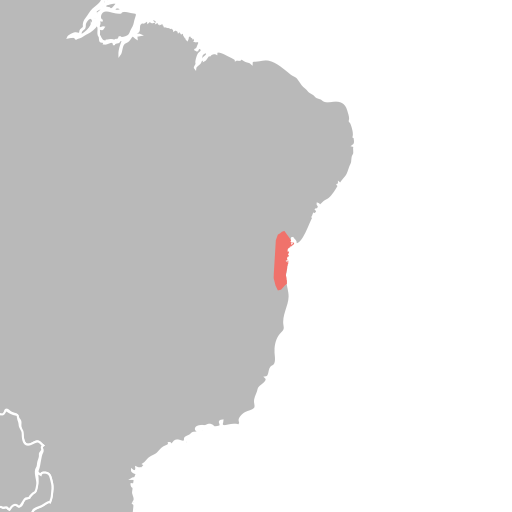
- Callistomys pictus distribution

Synonyms
- Isothrix picta Pictet, 1841; Echimys pictus (Pictet, 1841)

= Painted tree-rat =

Species of mammals belonging to the spiny rat family of rodents

The painted tree-rat (Callistomys pictus) is a species of spiny rat from Brazil, restricted to north-eastern Bahia in eastern Brazil. It is the only species in the genus Callistomys.

== Identification ==
With a total length of ca. 30 cm (12 in), it is a relatively large species of spiny rat. It is white with a strongly contrasting glossy-black cap, back and band down towards its forelimbs. Its long fur is dense and coarse, but not spiny, as in some other members of its family. Specimens often have brown (rather than black) markings, but as far as it is known this is caused by fading and does not occur in the living animals.

Owing to its striking black-and-white pelage, it is virtually unmistakable, but could perhaps be confused with a hairy dwarf porcupine (Coendou spp.) – all of which have spines and lack the distinctive pattern of the painted tree-rat.

== Etymology ==
- The genus name Callistomys derives from the two ancient greek words κάλλιστος (kállistos) meaning "very beautiful", — i.e., this is the superlative form of καλός (kalós) meaning "beautiful, handsome" —, and μῦς (mûs), meaning "rat".
- The species name derives from the Latin word pictus meaning colored, decorated, and refers to the white and black fur of this rodent.

== Habitat ==
The painted tree-rat is found in the Atlantic forest. It also occurs in cocoa plantations where some native trees remain. As far as known, it is nocturnal.

== Phylogeny ==
The painted tree-rat has been placed in different genera: Nelomys, Loncheres, or Isothrix. However, analyses of DNA and protein characters showed that the genus Callistomys is the sister group to the genus Myocastor (coypus or nutrias). In turn, these two taxa share evolutionary affinities with other Myocastorini genera: Proechimys and Hoplomys (armored rats) on the one hand, and Thrichomys on the other hand.

Genus-level cladogram of the Myocastorini.

- Myocastorini
  - Thrichomys (punaré)
  - - Callistomys (painted tree-rat)
    - Myocastor (nutria)
  - - Hoplomys (armored rat)
    - Proechimys

The cladogram has been reconstructed from mitochondrial and nuclear DNA characters.

== Conservation status ==
The painted tree-rat is currently listed as Endangered by the IUCN because of its fragmented distribution, its continuing decline and the quality of its habitat. An outlying record was not included in the assessment.

== See also ==
- Emmons, Louise H.; Feer, François (1997-09-02). Neotropical rainforest mammals. A field guide (2nd ed.). Chicago: University of Chicago Press. pp. 1–307. ISBN 978-0-226-20721-6. OCLC 44179508.
