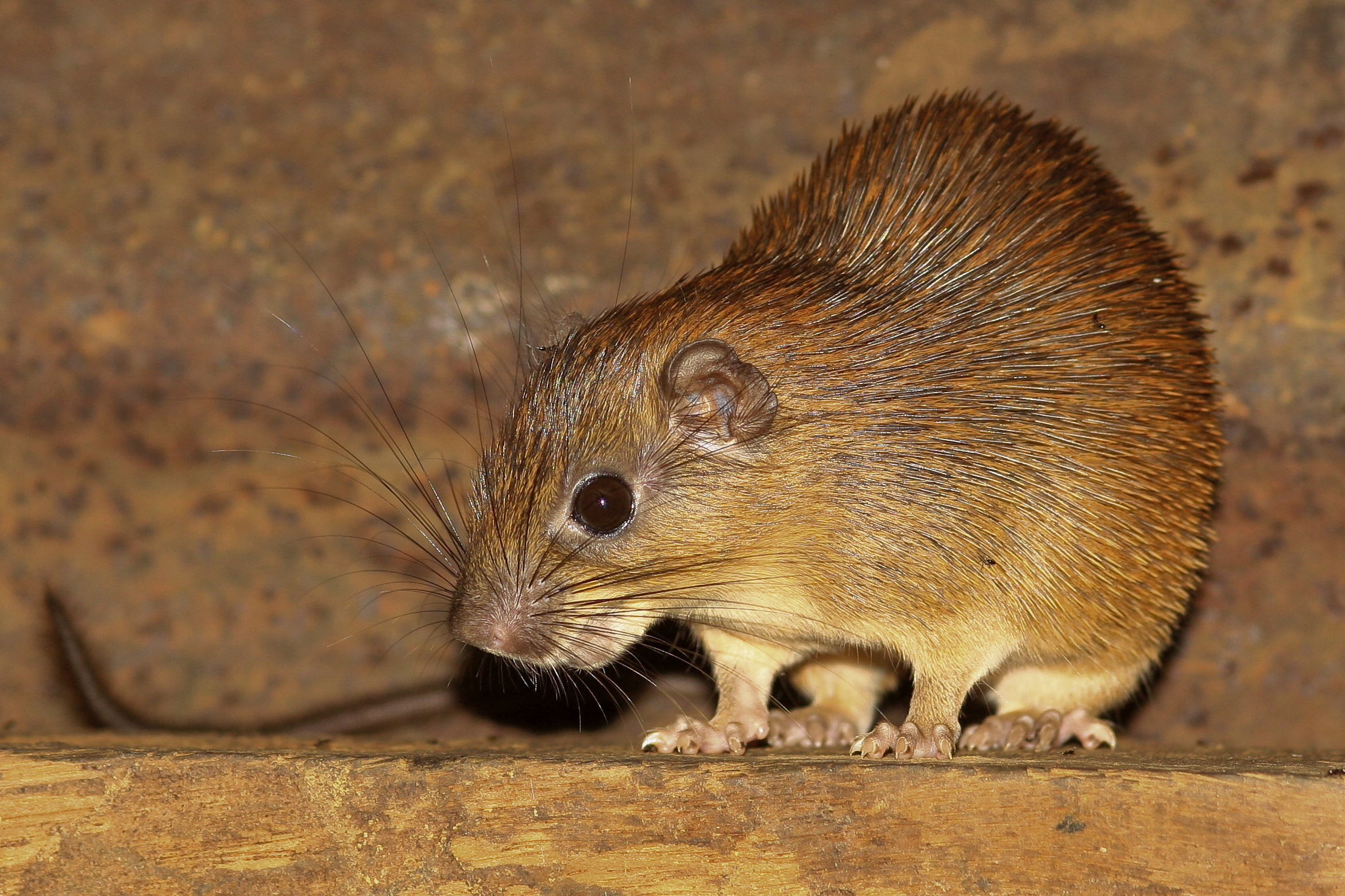
- Ferreira's spiny tree-rat, Mesomys hispidus

Scientific classification
- Kingdom: Animalia
- Phylum: Chordata
- Class: Mammalia
- Order: Rodentia
- Parvorder: Caviomorpha
- Superfamily: Octodontoidea
- Family: Echimyidae
- Subfamily: Echimyinae; Gray 1825

Tribes
- Echimyini; Myocastorini

= Echimyinae =

Subfamily of mammals belonging to the spiny rat family of rodents

Echimyinae is a subfamily of rodents belonging to the spiny rats family Echimyidae. It contains 14 arboreal genera—all the members of the tribe Echimyini, plus Callistomys—a few terrestrial genera (Thrichomys, Hoplomys, and Proechimys), and a subaquatic genus (Myocastor).

== Systematics ==
The taxonomic content of Echimyinae has been reshaped over time, because of two realizations. The first is a better understanding of the evolution of morphological characters, leading to the recognition that key character states long used to group genera into higher units were demonstrably homoplastic. The second came from the a phylogenetic analysis of molecular sequence data.

Comparison between molecular-based and traditional systematics for Echimyinae genera.
| Genera | Molecular-based systematics | Traditional systematics |
|---|---|---|
| Echimys | Echimyini | Echimyinae |
| Phyllomys | Echimyini | Echimyinae |
| Makalata | Echimyini | Echimyinae |
| Pattonomys | Echimyini | Echimyinae |
| Toromys | Echimyini | Echimyinae |
| Diplomys | Echimyini | Echimyinae |
| Santamartamys | Echimyini | Echimyinae |
| Isothrix | Echimyini | Echimyinae |
| Dactylomys | Echimyini | Dactylomyinae |
| Olallamys | Echimyini | Dactylomyinae |
| Kannabateomys | Echimyini | Dactylomyinae |
| Lonchothrix | Echimyini | Eumysopinae |
| Mesomys | Echimyini | Eumysopinae |
| Callistomys | Myocastorini | Echimyinae |
| Myocastor | Myocastorini | Myocastoridae |
| Thrichomys | Myocastorini | Eumysopinae |
| Hoplomys | Myocastorini | Eumysopinae |
| Proechimys | Myocastorini | Eumysopinae |

== Phylogeny ==
The subfamily Echimyinae groups most of the spiny rat family's generic diversity into two tribes: Echimyini and Myocastorini.

Genus-level cladogram of the Echimyinae.

- Echimyinae
  - - Myocastorini
      - Thrichomys (punaré)
      - - Callistomys (painted tree-rat)
        - Myocastor (nutria)
      - - Hoplomys (armored rat)
        - Proechimys
  - - Echimyini
      - Isothrix
      - - "Eumysopines"
          - Lonchothrix
            (Tuft-tailed spiny tree-rat)
          - Mesomys
        - - - - Pattonomys
              - Toromys
                (Giant tree-rat)
            - - Makalata
              - - Echimys
                - Phyllomys
          - - - Diplomys
              - Santamartamys
                (Red-crested tree-rat)
            - "Dactylomyines"
              - Kannabateomys
                (Atlantic bamboo rat)
              - - Dactylomys
                - Olallamys

The cladogram has been reconstructed from mitochondrial and nuclear DNA characters.
