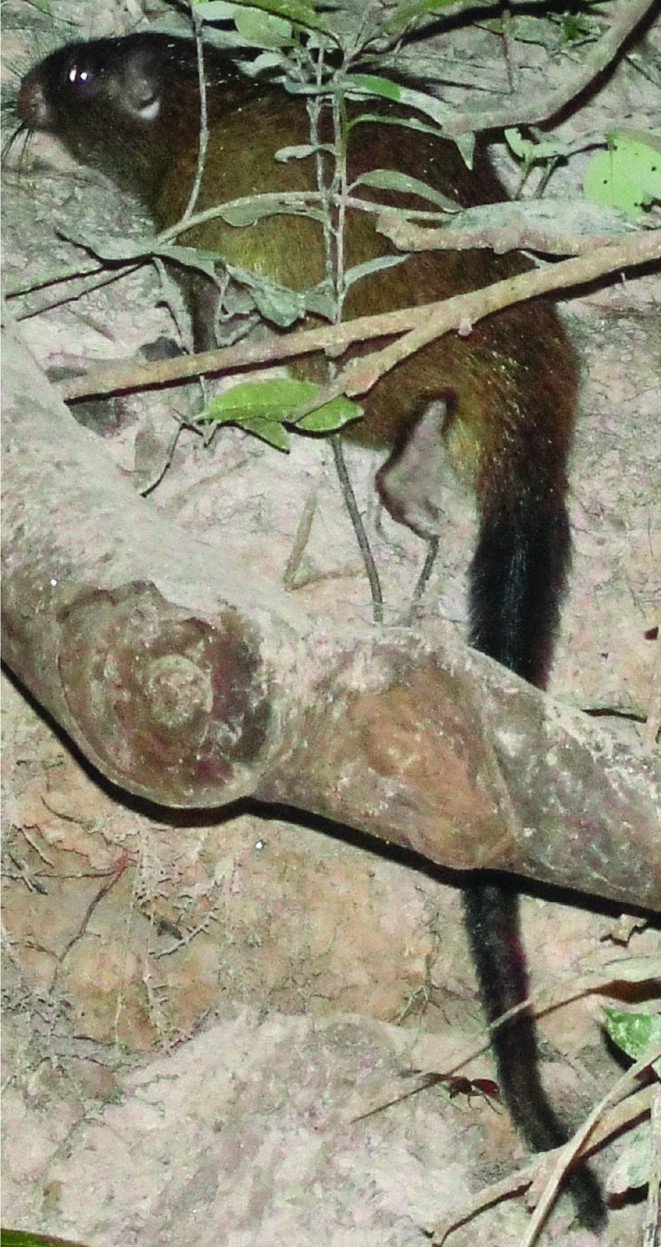

Conservation status
- Least Concern (IUCN 3.1)

Scientific classification
- Kingdom: Animalia
- Phylum: Chordata
- Class: Mammalia
- Infraclass: Placentalia
- Order: Rodentia
- Family: Echimyidae
- Subfamily: Echimyinae
- Tribe: Echimyini
- Genus: Toromys; Iack-Ximenes, De Vivo, & Percequillo, 2005
- Species: T. grandis

Binomial name
- Toromys grandis (Wagner, 1845)
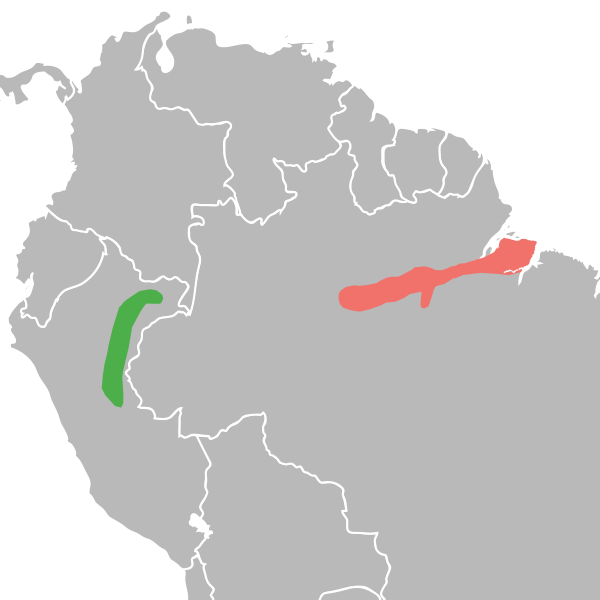
- Toromys distribution T. grandis in red

Synonyms
- Loncheres grandis Wagner, 1845; Echimys grandis (Wagner, 1845); Makalata grandis (Wagner, 1845)

= Giant tree-rat =

Species of mammals belonging to the spiny rat family of rodents

The giant tree-rat (Toromys grandis) is a species in the family Echimyidae, the spiny rats. It is the only species in the monotypic genus Toromys. It is endemic to Brazil, where it occurs in the flooded forest along the banks of the Amazon River and its tributaries.

This species was formerly considered to be a member of the genera Loncheres and Makalata. In 2005 it was reclassified as the only member of the new genus Toromys.

The etymology of the genus name derives from the onomatopoeic Portuguese word toró, referring to the vocalizations of this rodent, and the ancient greek word μῦς (mûs), meaning "mouse, rat".

== Phylogeny ==
Toromys is the sister genus to Pattonomys. These taxa are closely related to Echimys, Phyllomys, and Makalata, reflecting the fact that Toromys grandis and Pattonomys occasius have formerly been placed in Makalata by some authorities. In turn, these five genera share phylogenetic affinities with a clade containing the bamboo rats Dactylomys, Olallamys, Kannabateomys together with Diplomys and Santamartamys.

Genus-level cladogram of the Echimyini.

- Echimyini
  - Isothrix
  - - "Eumysopines"
      - Lonchothrix
        (Tuft-tailed spiny tree-rat)
      - Mesomys
    - - - - Pattonomys
          - Toromys
            (Giant tree-rat)
        - - Makalata
          - - Echimys
            - Phyllomys
      - - - Diplomys
          - Santamartamys
            (Red-crested tree-rat)
        - "Dactylomyines"
          - Kannabateomys
            (Atlantic bamboo rat)
          - - Dactylomys
            - Olallamys

The cladogram has been reconstructed from mitochondrial and nuclear DNA characters.
