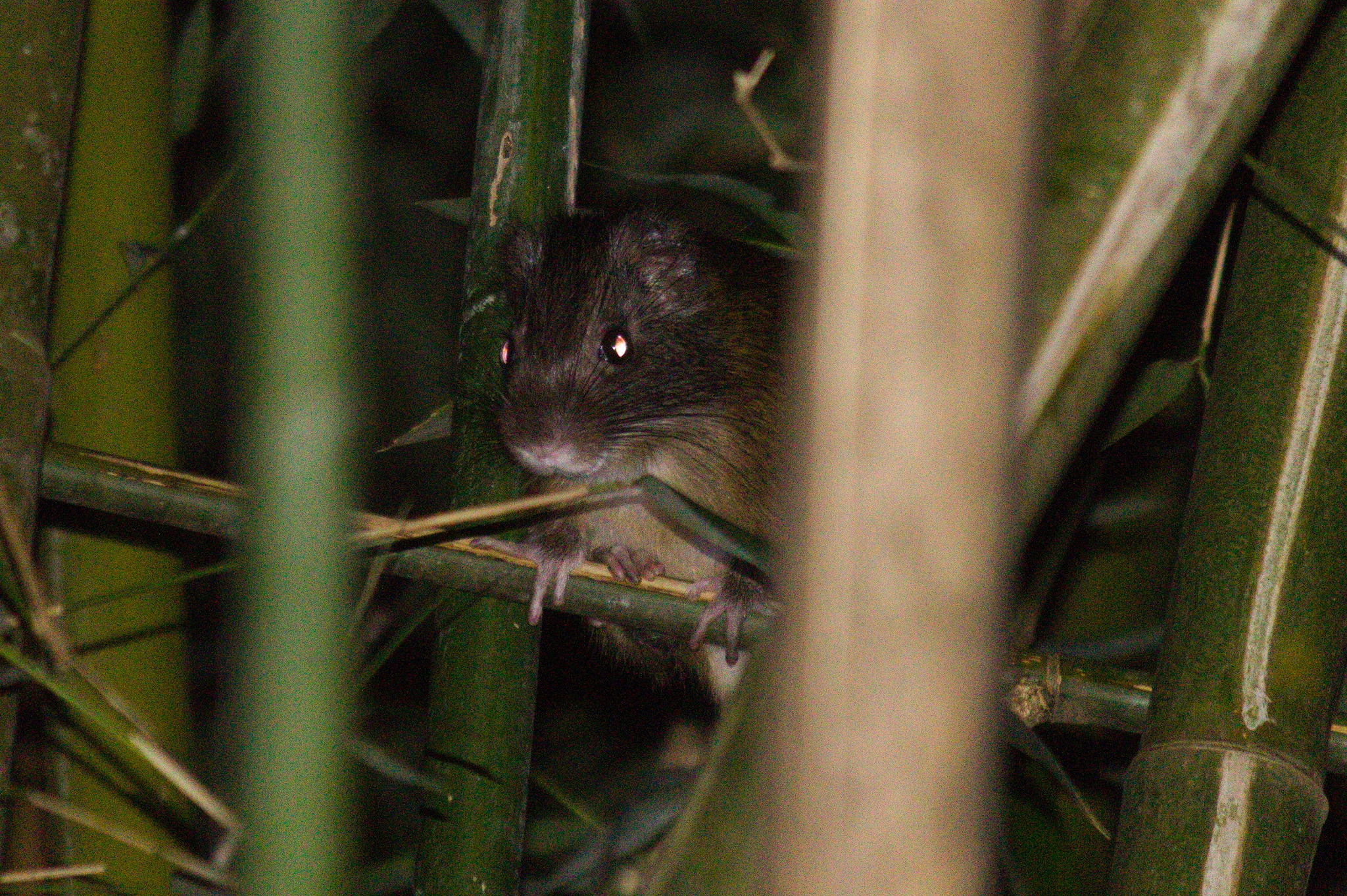

Conservation status
- Least Concern (IUCN 3.1)

Scientific classification
- Kingdom: Animalia
- Phylum: Chordata
- Class: Mammalia
- Order: Rodentia
- Family: Echimyidae
- Subfamily: Echimyinae
- Tribe: Echimyini
- Genus: Kannabateomys; Jentink, 1891
- Species: K. amblyonyx

Binomial name
- Kannabateomys amblyonyx (Wagner, 1845)

Subspecies
- K. a. amblyonyx (Wagner, 1845); K. a. pallidior Thomas, 1903
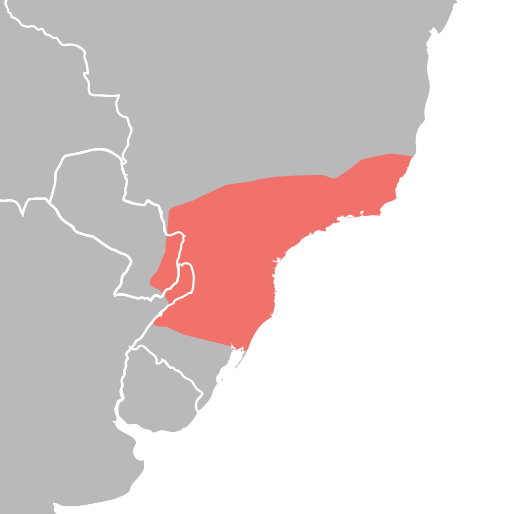
- Kannabateomys amblyonyx distribution

= Atlantic bamboo rat =

Atlantic bamboo rat Temporal range: Pleistocene to Recent

Genus of South American spiny rats

The Atlantic bamboo rat (Kannabateomys amblyonyx), or southern bamboo rat, is a spiny rat species found in humid tropical forests in Argentina, Brazil and Paraguay. It is the only member of the genus Kannabateomys.

== Description ==
The Atlantic bamboo rat can reach a head-and-body length of 25 cm (10 in) with a tail of 32 cm (12.6 in). Its weight is about 475 g (1 lb 1 oz). The pelage is the typical agouti brown-to-grey colour of many rodents, grading to chestnut on the flanks. The chin and underparts are white tinged with reddish brown. The first 6 cm (2.4 in) of the tail are well-haired but the rest is sparsely haired. There is a distinct tuft of hairs at the tip. When fully grown, this bamboo rat with its long tail is unlikely to be mistaken for any other species.

== Etymology ==
The genus name Kannabateomys derives from three Ancient Greek words: κάννα (kánna), meaning "reed, cane", βατέω (batéō), meaning "I mount, cover", and μῦς (mûs), meaning "mouse, rat".

The species name amblyonyx derives from the two Ancient Greek words ἀμβλύς (amblús), meaning "blunt, not sharp", and ὄνυξ (ónux), meaning "claw, fingernail".

== Distribution and habitat ==
This species is native to South America, where its range includes southeastern Brazil, eastern Paraguay and northeastern Argentina. The typical habitat is moist forests near water with dense understorey of bamboos. It is particularly associated with the giant bamboo Guadua angustifolia, which forms thickets.

== Ecology ==
The Atlantic bamboo rat is nocturnal and is highly arboreal, scrambling around in trees and bamboos, especially near water. The home range is about 1,000 m^{2} (1,200 yd^{2}). When alarmed it issues loud squeals. It probably feeds on grasses, leaves, shoots, fruits and tubers.

== Phylogeny ==
Kannabateomys is a member of the Echimyini clade of arboreal Echimyidae rodents. Its closest relatives are Dactylomys and Olallamys. These South American bamboo rats share unique features and are grouped under the informal clade name of "Dactylomyines". The dactylomyines are the sister genera to Diplomys and Santamartamys. All these taxa are closely related to the genera Echimys, Phyllomys, Makalata, Pattonomys, and Toromys. In turn, these genera share phylogenetic affinities with the clade containing Lonchothrix and Mesomys, and with Isothrix.

Genus-level cladogram of the Echimyini

- Echimyini
  - Isothrix
  - - "Eumysopines"
      - Lonchothrix
        (Tuft-tailed spiny tree-rat)
      - Mesomys
    - - - - Pattonomys
          - Toromys
            (Giant tree-rat)
        - - Makalata
          - - Echimys
            - Phyllomys
      - - - Diplomys
          - Santamartamys
            (Red-crested tree-rat)
        - "Dactylomyines"
          - Kannabateomys
            (Atlantic bamboo rat)
          - - Dactylomys
            - Olallamys

The cladogram has been reconstructed from mitochondrial and nuclear DNA characters.

== Status ==
K. amblyonyx is not a common species. In the state of Rio Grande do Sul in Brazil, for example, it has been recorded as having a density of just over four individuals per square kilometre. As a nocturnal animal it is seldom seen, but it has an extensive range and is presumed to have a large total population. In some places, such as in the state of Minas Gerais in Brazil, it is threatened locally by forest clearance, but other specific threats have not been identified and the International Union for Conservation of Nature has rated its conservation status as "least concern".
