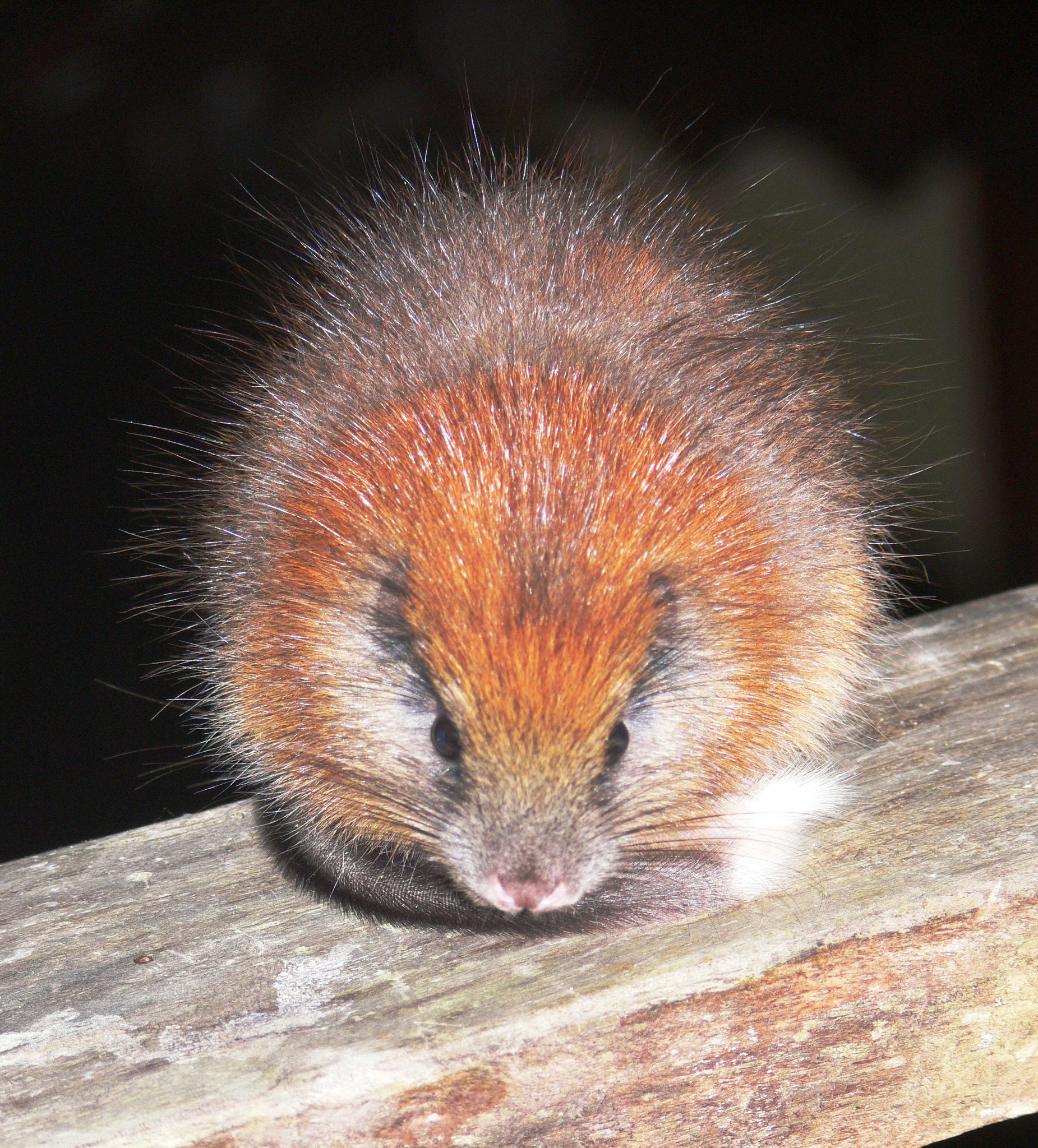
- El Dorado ProAves Reserve, Santa Marta, Colombia

Conservation status
- Critically Endangered (IUCN 3.1)

Scientific classification
- Kingdom: Animalia
- Phylum: Chordata
- Class: Mammalia
- Order: Rodentia
- Family: Echimyidae
- Subfamily: Echimyinae
- Tribe: Echimyini
- Genus: Santamartamys; Emmons, 2005
- Species: S. rufodorsalis

Binomial name
- Santamartamys rufodorsalis (J. A. Allen, 1899)
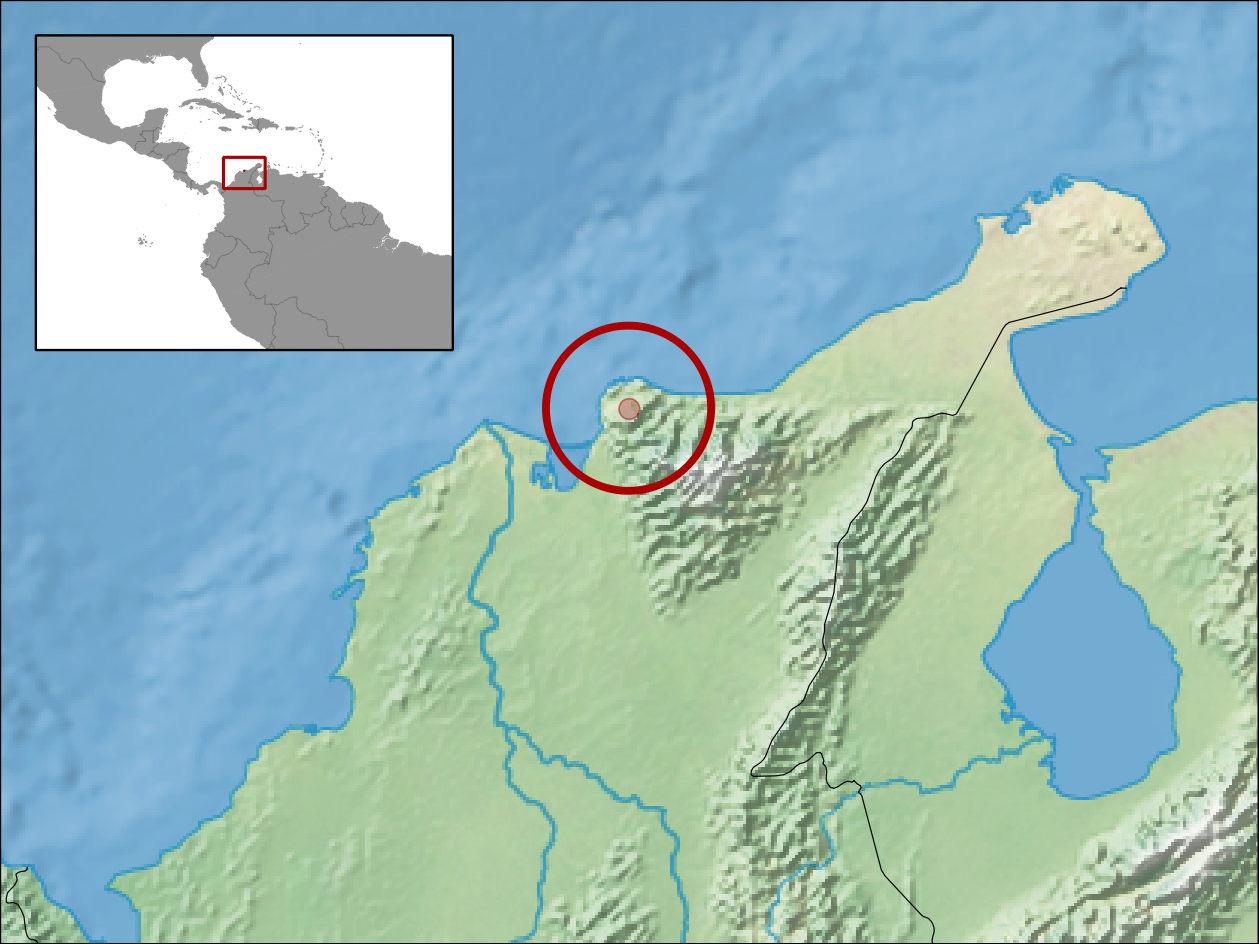

Synonyms
- Diplomys rufodorsalis; Isothrix rufodorsalis

= Red-crested tree-rat =

Species of rodent

The red-crested tree-rat or Santa Marta toro (Santamartamys rufodorsalis) is a species of tree-rat found in the monotypic genus Santamartamys in the family Echimyidae. It is nocturnal and is believed to feed on plant matter, and is mainly rufous, with young specimens having a grey coat. IUCN list the species as critically endangered: it is affected by feral cats, climate change, and the clearing of forest in its potential range in coastal Colombia.

It is known only from three specimens, a specimen collected in 1898 in Sierra Nevada de Santa Marta and identified by Herbert Huntingdon Smith, a specimen identified by the American ornithologist and entomologist Melbourne Armstrong Carriker in 1913 at the same location, and a further specimen observed in the same location in 2011. Found at altitudes of 700 to 2,000 meters, the species is endemic to Colombia in an isolated area with high levels of biodiversity. The species was initially identified as Isothrix rufodorsalis in 1899, re-classified as Diplomys rufodorsalis in 1935, and the monotypic genus Santamartamys was created in 2005 for the species.

== Discovery ==
On 24 December 1898, Herbert Huntingdon Smith identified the first specimen of Santamartamys in Ocana, Santa Marta, Magdalena, Colombia. The specimen was of undetermined sex, and as all specimens of Smith's collections were collected by local hunters, there is no specific information regarding the location where the specimen was discovered. A second specimen, also of undetermined sex, was discovered in around 1913 in the Sierra Nevada de Santa Marta by Carriker, but there is not much information regarding its location either, or the date of discovery. It is assumed that the specimen was obtained through a gift or was purchased. It was recorded as a Santamartamys specimen in 1913 at the American Museum of Natural History in New York. Despite several organized searches, no other specimens were discovered.

However, on 4 May 2011, two volunteers from Fundación ProAves photographed one individual at 1,958 m (6,424 ft) above sea level in El Dorado ProAves Reserve (11°06′02.93″N 74°04′19.36″W) that was subsequently identified by Paul Salaman.

== Description ==
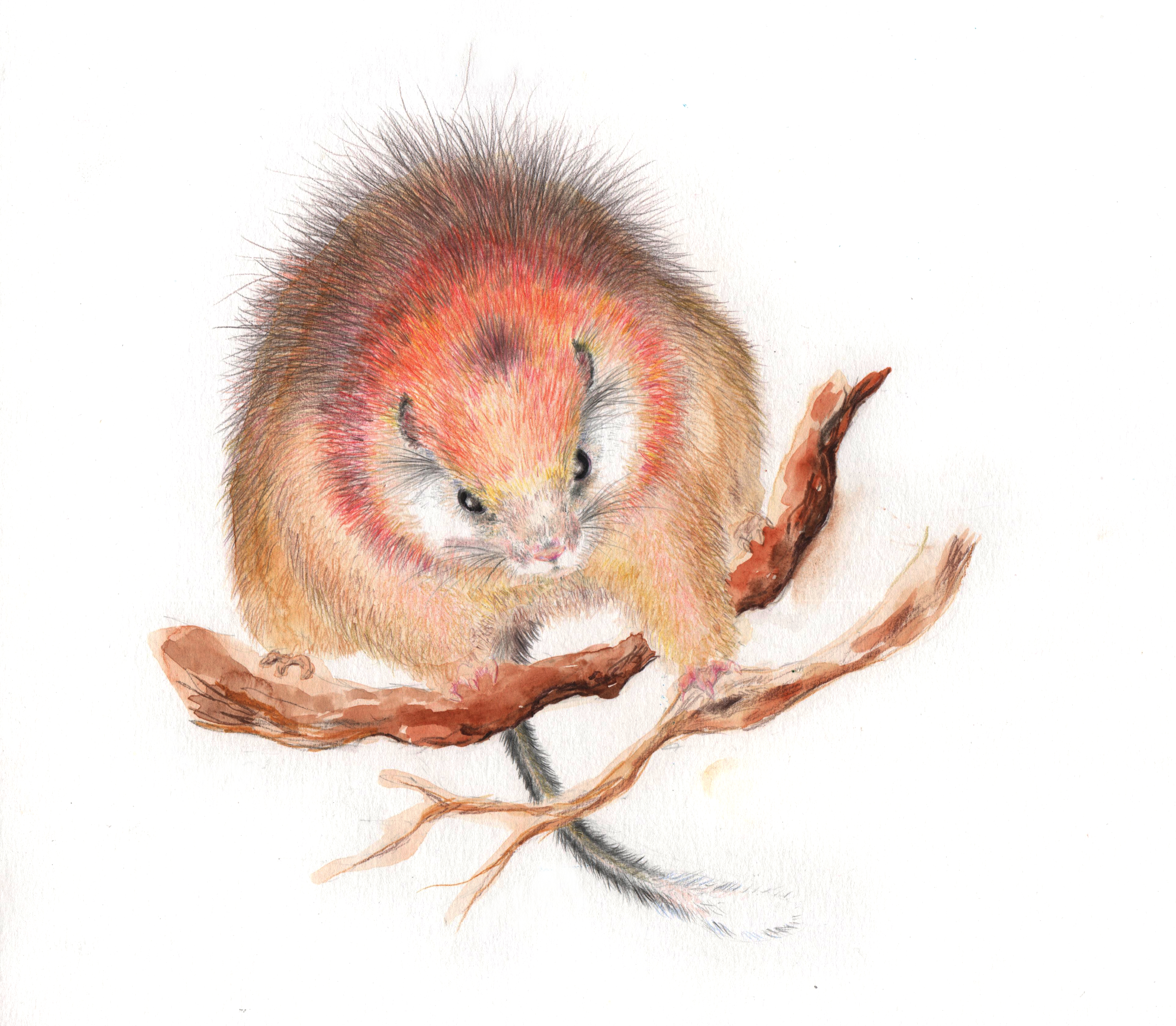
Illustration of Santamartamys rufodorsalis

Santamartamys specimens measure between 51 cm (20 in) from head to the tip of their tail, with their tails measuring between 18 and 28 cm (7.1 and 11.0 in). The species can weigh up to 500 g (18 oz), and has a woolly, soft, and long coat. The species is mainly rufous. The hair on the dorsal region is of intense red coloring, and a large portion of the tail hair is black (basal), but the last two-fifths of the tail are white. Its ears are small and light brown, and feature tufts of long hair on the inner surface, but lack hair on the outer surface. Between the eye and the ear, there is a tuft of long black hairs. The thin whiskers can reach up to 13 cm (5 in) long, and has a strip of red fur around its neck.

The upper surfaces of the front and rear legs are covered in a pale gray coat, and the hind legs are very short and wide. The feet lack small tubercles and the thumb is covered by a nail. Its skull is short and wide, and it has a heavy, large, and uncurved zygomatic bone. The supraorbital ridge of the skull is large, and the interorbital region is very broad with nearly parallel sides. The facial portion of the skull is very short, and the distance between the incisors and the molars is slightly less than the length of the coronary surface of its upper row of teeth. Santamartamys has large eyes, which is consistent with its nocturnal behavior. It has two pairs of udders on the lateral edge of the abdominal side coat.

Young specimens of Santamartamys have a grey coat. During the transition to the adult intense red coat, molting begins at the anterior region and moves backward.

== Behavior, distribution and habitat ==
Santamartamys is a nocturnal rodent, and its diet is unknown, but it is assumed to feed on plant matter such as fruits or seeds, like similar species in family Echimyidae. It is able to easily climb a vertical wooden surface. The specimen observed in 2011 made no sounds. It is endemic to Colombia, and has only been found in Sierra Nevada de Santa Marta at altitudes of 700 to 2,000 m (2,300 to 6,600 ft). Due to the location's isolation and specific geological and climatic conditions, this mountainous region has high levels of biodiversity and endemism. It is believed that the habitat of Santamartamys is suffering degradation.

== Classification ==
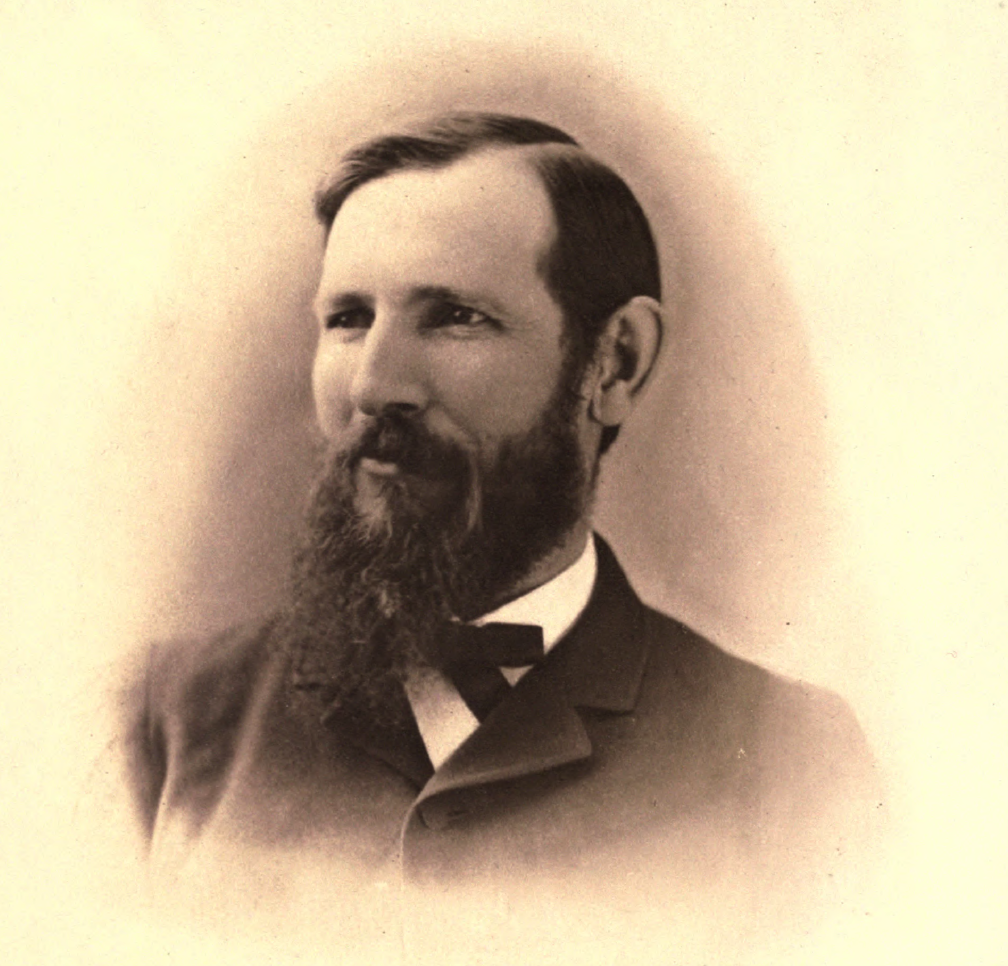
Joel Asaph Allen first described the species as Isothrix rufodorsalis in 1899.

Known as the "red-crested tree rat", this species was originally described as Isothrix rufodorsalis by American biologist Joel Asaph Allen in 1899, and was transferred to genus Diplomys in 1935 by George Henry Hamilton Tate. In 2005, its subfamily Echimyinae was revised by Louise Emmons from the Smithsonian Institution, and identified a number of unique features of this species, including the differences between the teeth of this species and others in genus Diplomys. This resulted in the establishment of monotypic genus Santamartamys.

The genus name Santamartamys comes from "Santa Marta", part of the name of the location where the specimens were found, and mys, meaning "mouse". Rufodorsalis comes from Latin, with rufus and dorsalis meaning "red" and "back", respectively, referring to the color of this rodent.

== Phylogeny ==
Santamartamys is a member of the Echimyini clade of arboreal Echimyidae rodents. The closest relative of Santamartamys is Diplomys, reflecting the fact that these taxa have once been classified in the same genus. These two genera constitute the sister group of the "Dactylomyines", a clade of South American bamboo rats. All these taxa are closely related to the genera Echimys, Phyllomys, Makalata, Pattonomys, and Toromys. In turn, these genera share phylogenetic affinities with the clade containing Lonchothrix and Mesomys, and with Isothrix.

Genus-level cladogram of the Echimyini.

- Echimyini
  - Isothrix
  - - "Eumysopines"
      - Lonchothrix
        (Tuft-tailed spiny tree-rat)
      - Mesomys
    - - - - Pattonomys
          - Toromys
            (Giant tree-rat)
        - - Makalata
          - - Echimys
            - Phyllomys
      - - - Diplomys
          - Santamartamys
            (Red-crested tree-rat)
        - "Dactylomyines"
          - Kannabateomys
            (Atlantic bamboo rat)
          - - Dactylomys
            - Olallamys

The cladogram has been reconstructed from mitochondrial and nuclear DNA characters.

== Threats and protection ==
Santamartamys was rediscovered on 4 May 2011 in El Dorado ProAves Reserve, a protected area of Sierra Nevada de Santa Marta. Set up on 31 March 2006, this reserve covers 1,024 ha (2,530 acres) at an altitude between 950 and 2,600 m (3,120 and 8,530 ft), and contains a large number of endemic or endangered species.

In 1990, Emmons believed that Santamartamys was one of the rarest Neotropical mammals. The International Union for Conservation of Nature (IUCN) described the species as "Vulnerable" in 1996. In 2008, IUCN re-classified it as "data deficient", given the lack of information regarding the distribution, ecology and habitat of this rodent. Following a reassessment in 2011, the species was listed as "critically endangered", with much of the forest in the potential range of the species having been cleared or degraded. Much of its potential area is infested with feral cats (who feed on fauna), and climate change is a long-term threat to the species.

== See also ==
- Fauna of Colombia
- IUCN Red List
