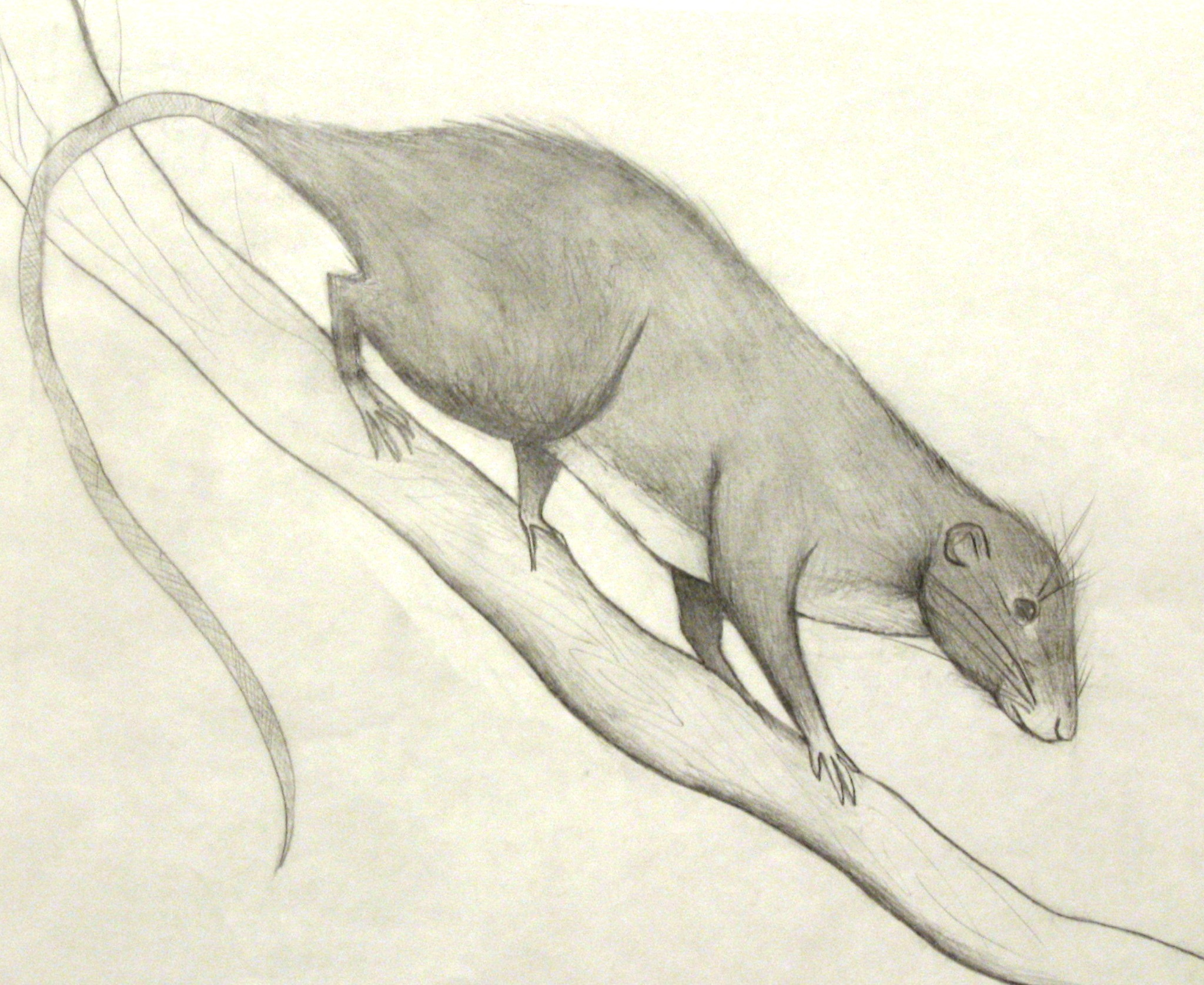

Scientific classification
- Kingdom: Animalia
- Phylum: Chordata
- Class: Mammalia
- Infraclass: Placentalia
- Order: Rodentia
- Family: Echimyidae
- Subfamily: Echimyinae
- Tribe: Echimyini
- Genus: Dactylomys; I. Geoffroy, 1838

Type species
- Dactylomys typus I. Geoffroy, 1838 (=Echimys dactylinus Desmarest, 1817

Species
- Dactylomys boliviensis Dactylomys dactylinus Dactylomys peruanus
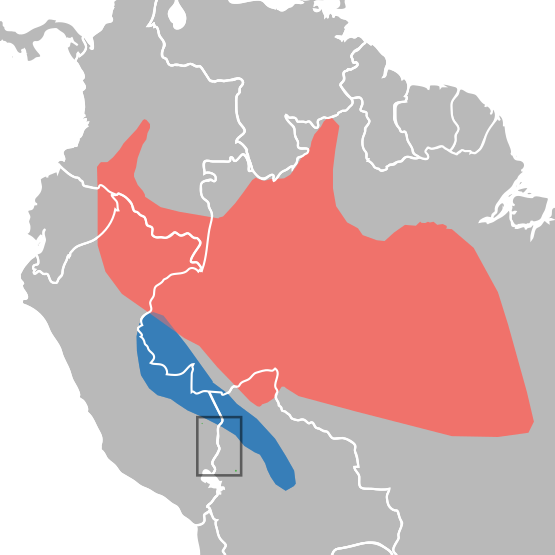
- Dactylomys distribution D. dactylinus in red, D. boliviensis in blue, D. peruanus in green (in box)

Synonyms
- Lachnomys Thomas, 1916

= Dactylomys =

Genus of mammals belonging to the spiny rat family of rodents

Dactylomys is the genus of South American bamboo rats They are arboreal members of the family Echimyidae.

== Systematics ==
The genus name Dactylomys derives from the two Ancient Greek words δάκτυλος (dáktulos), meaning "finger", and μῦς (mûs), meaning "mouse, rat", and refers to the middle two digits especially elongated relative to lateral ones as observed in these rodents.

The genus contains three species:

- Dactylomys boliviensis (Bolivian bamboo rat)
- Dactylomys dactylinus (Amazon bamboo rat)
- Dactylomys peruanus (Montane bamboo rat)

== Phylogeny ==
Dactylomys is a member of the Echimyini clade of arboreal Echimyidae rodents. The closest relative of Dactylomys is Olallamys, and then Kannabateomys. These South American bamboo rats share unique features and are grouped under the informal clade name of "Dactylomyines". The dactylomyines are the sister genera to Diplomys and Santamartamys. All these taxa are closely related to the genera Echimys, Phyllomys, Makalata, Pattonomys, and Toromys. In turn, these genera share phylogenetic affinities with the clade containing Lonchothrix and Mesomys, and with Isothrix.

Genus-level cladogram of the Echimyini.

- Echimyini
  - Isothrix
  - - "Eumysopines"
      - Lonchothrix
        (Tuft-tailed spiny tree-rat)
      - Mesomys
    - - - - Pattonomys
          - Toromys
            (Giant tree-rat)
        - - Makalata
          - - Echimys
            - Phyllomys
      - - - Diplomys
          - Santamartamys
            (Red-crested tree-rat)
        - "Dactylomyines"
          - Kannabateomys
            (Atlantic bamboo rat)
          - - Dactylomys
            - Olallamys

The cladogram has been reconstructed from mitochondrial and nuclear DNA characters.
