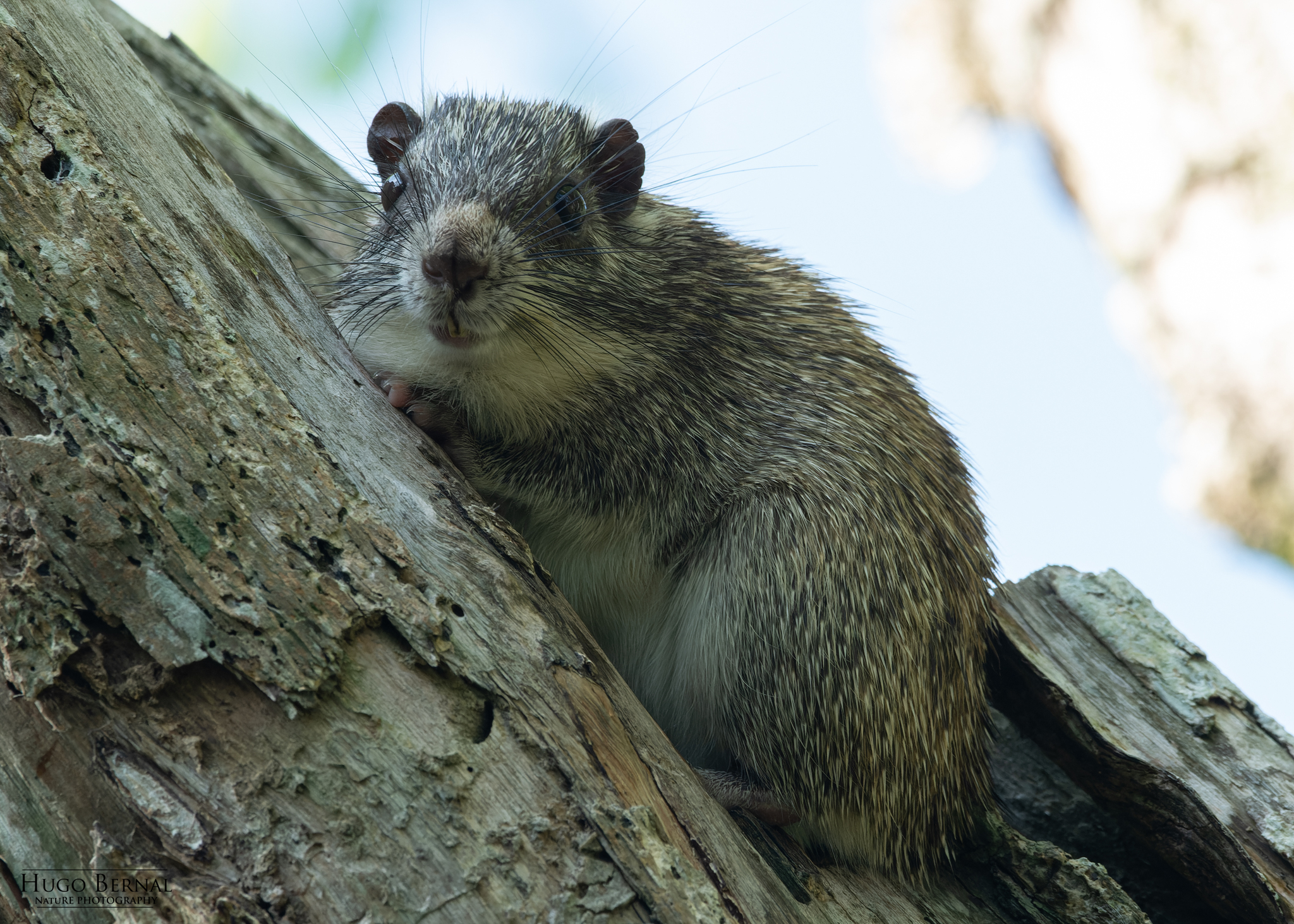
- Pattonomys semivillosus

Scientific classification
- Kingdom: Animalia
- Phylum: Chordata
- Class: Mammalia
- Order: Rodentia
- Superfamily: Octodontoidea
- Family: Echimyidae
- Subfamily: Echimyinae
- Tribe: Echimyini
- Genus: Pattonomys; Emmons, 2005

Type species
- Nelomys semivillosus I. Geoffroy, 1838

Species
- Pattonomys occasius Pattonomys semivillosus
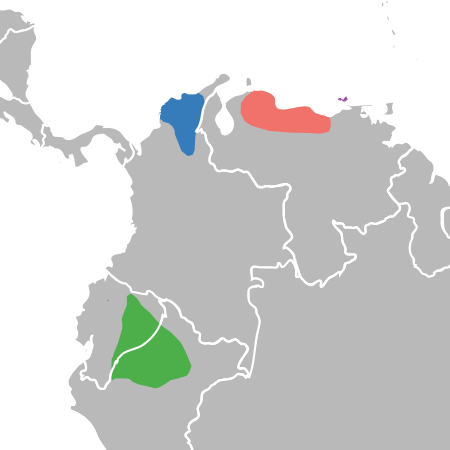
- Pattonomys distribution P. occasius in green, P. semivillosus in blue, P. carrikeri in red, P. flavidus in purple; P. punctatus distribution unknown

= Pattonomys =

Genus of mammals belonging to the spiny rat family of rodents

Pattonomys is a genus of rodent in the family Echimyidae, named after American mammalogist James L. Patton. It contains the following species:

- Bare-tailed armored tree-rat (Pattonomys occasius)
- Speckled spiny tree-rat (Pattonomys semivillosus)

== Phylogeny ==
Pattonomys is the sister genus to Toromys. These taxa are closely related to Echimys, Phyllomys, and Makalata, reflecting the fact that Pattonomys occasius and Toromys grandis have formerly been placed in Makalata by some authorities. In turn, these five genera share phylogenetic affinities with a clade containing the bamboo rats Dactylomys, Olallamys, Kannabateomys together with Diplomys and Santamartamys.

Genus-level cladogram of the Echimyini.

- Echimyini
  - Isothrix
  - - "Eumysopines"
      - Lonchothrix
        (Tuft-tailed spiny tree-rat)
      - Mesomys
    - - - - Pattonomys
          - Toromys
            (Giant tree-rat)
        - - Makalata
          - - Echimys
            - Phyllomys
      - - - Diplomys
          - Santamartamys
            (Red-crested tree-rat)
        - "Dactylomyines"
          - Kannabateomys
            (Atlantic bamboo rat)
          - - Dactylomys
            - Olallamys

The cladogram has been reconstructed from mitochondrial and nuclear DNA characters.
