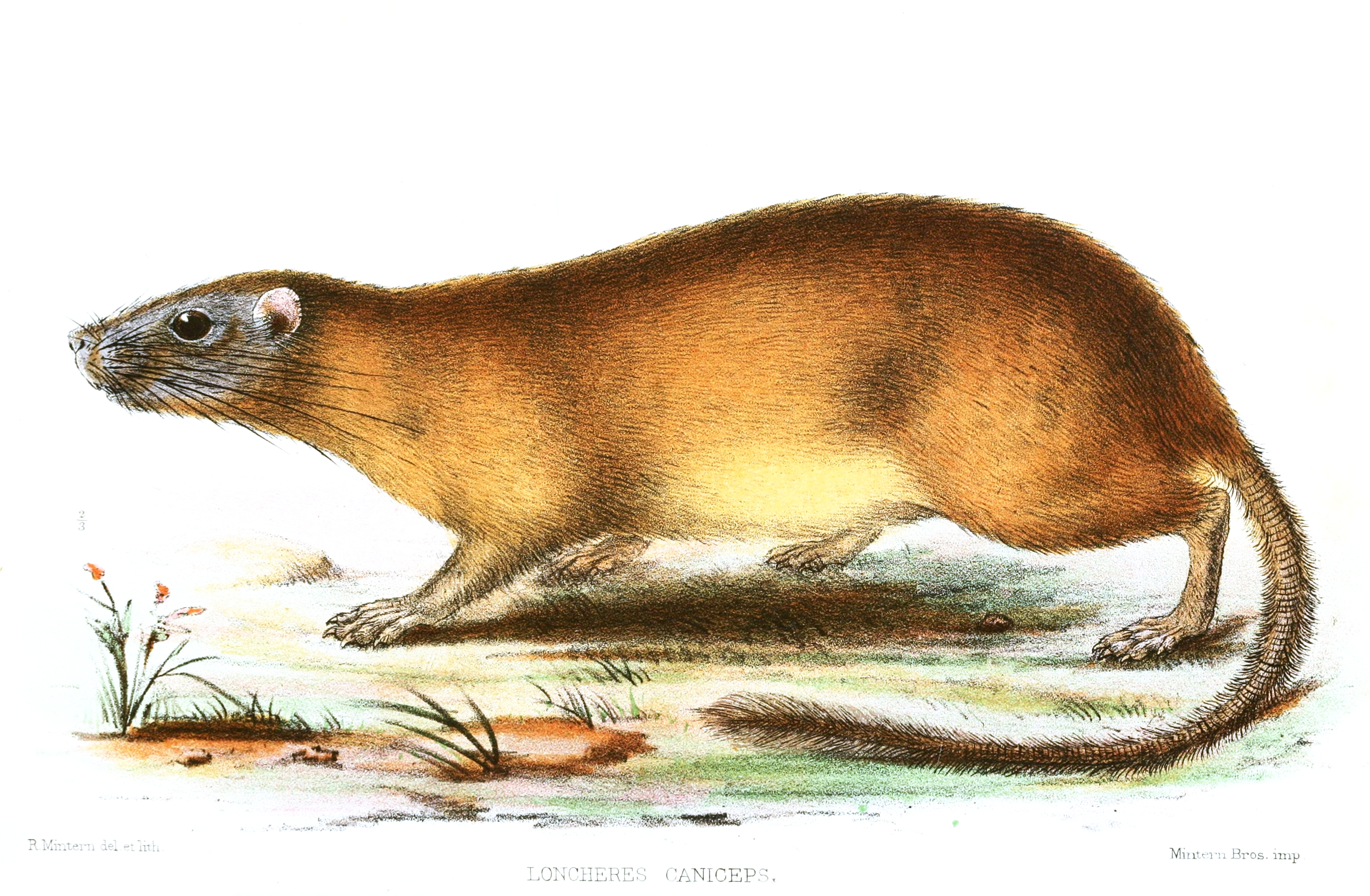
- Colombian soft-furred spiny rat, Diplomys caniceps

Scientific classification
- Kingdom: Animalia
- Phylum: Chordata
- Class: Mammalia
- Infraclass: Placentalia
- Order: Rodentia
- Family: Echimyidae
- Subfamily: Echimyinae
- Tribe: Echimyini
- Genus: Diplomys; Thomas, 1916

Type species
- Loncheres caniceps Günther, 1877

Species
- Diplomys caniceps Diplomys labilis
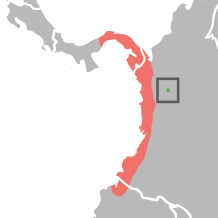
- Diplomys distribution D. labilis in red, D. caniceps in green (in box)

= Diplomys =

Genus of mammals belonging to the spiny rat family of rodents

Diplomys is a genus of rodent in the family Echimyidae. They are found in Costa Rica, Ecuador, Colombia and Panama.

== Systematics ==
The genus contains the following species:

- Colombian soft-furred spiny rat (Diplomys caniceps)
- Rufous soft-furred spiny rat (Diplomys labilis)

== Phylogeny ==
Diplomys is a member of the Echimyini clade of arboreal Echimyidae rodents. The closest relative of Diplomys is Santamartamys, reflecting the fact that these taxa have once been classified in the same genus. These two genera constitute the sister group of the "Dactylomyines", a clade of South American bamboo rats. All these taxa are closely related to the genera Echimys, Phyllomys, Makalata, Pattonomys, and Toromys. In turn, these genera share phylogenetic affinities with the clade containing Lonchothrix and Mesomys, and with Isothrix.

Genus-level cladogram of the Echimyini.

- Echimyini
  - Isothrix
  - - "Eumysopines"
      - Lonchothrix
        (Tuft-tailed spiny tree-rat)
      - Mesomys
    - - - - Pattonomys
          - Toromys
            (Giant tree-rat)
        - - Makalata
          - - Echimys
            - Phyllomys
      - - - Diplomys
          - Santamartamys
            (Red-crested tree-rat)
        - "Dactylomyines"
          - Kannabateomys
            (Atlantic bamboo rat)
          - - Dactylomys
            - Olallamys

The cladogram has been reconstructed from mitochondrial and nuclear DNA characters.
