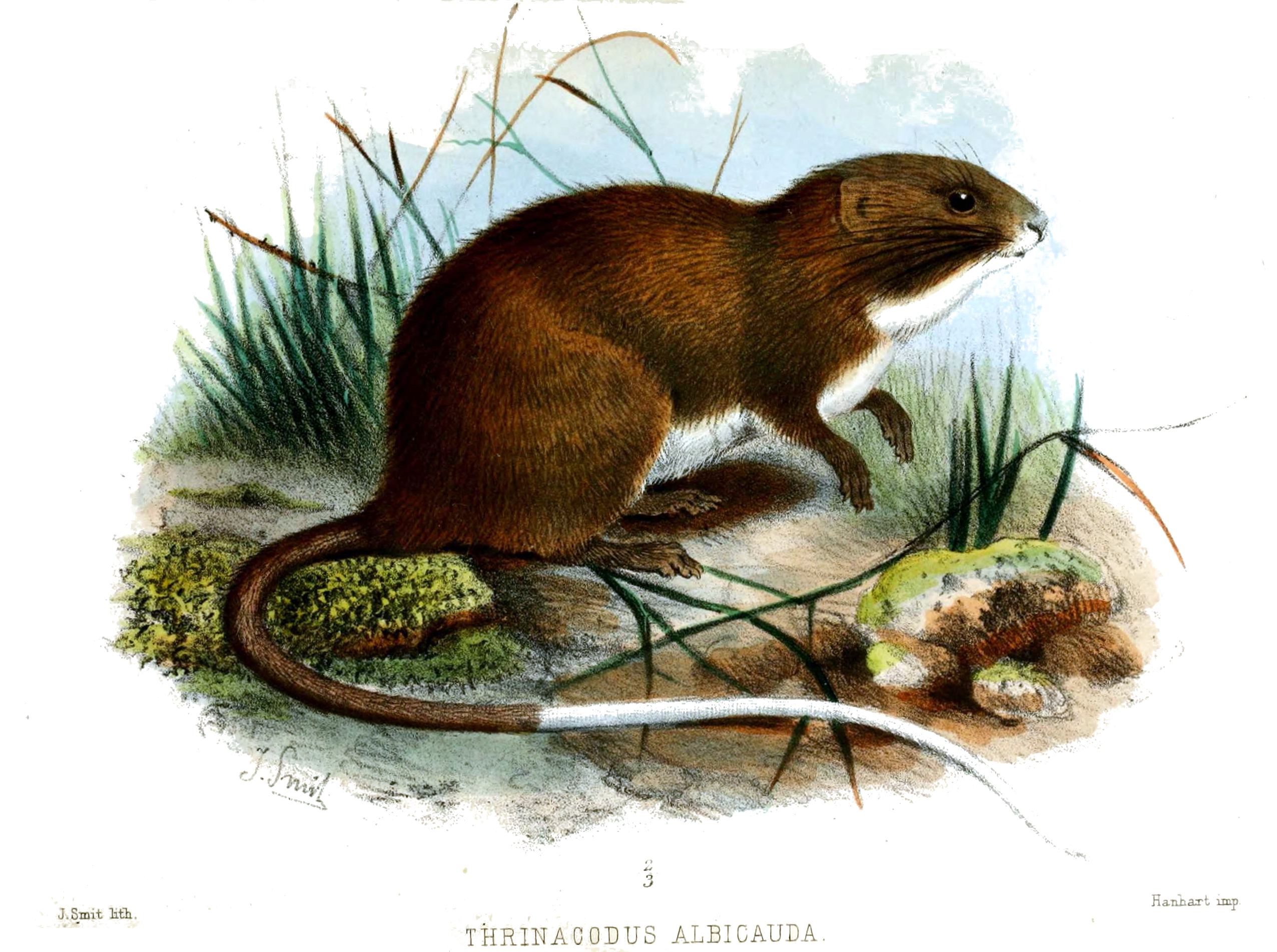
- White-tailed olalla rat, Olallamys albicauda

Scientific classification
- Kingdom: Animalia
- Phylum: Chordata
- Class: Mammalia
- Infraclass: Placentalia
- Order: Rodentia
- Family: Echimyidae
- Subfamily: Echimyinae
- Tribe: Echimyini
- Genus: Olallamys; Emmons, 1988

Type species
- Thrinacodus albicauda Günther, 1879

Species
- Olallamys albicauda Olallamys edax
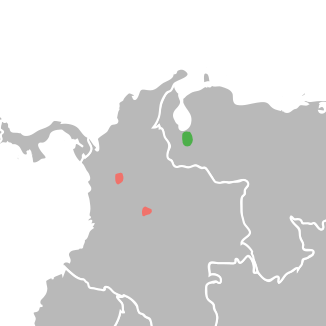
- Olallamys distribution O. albicauda in red, O. edax in green

= Olallamys =

Genus of mammals belonging to the spiny rat family of rodents

Olallamys is a genus of Andean soft-furred spiny rat that range from Panama through Colombia and Venezuela to northern Ecuador. These species are typically found at elevations above 2,000 metres (6,600 ft).

== Systematics ==
Olallamys is a taxonomic patronym honoring the Ecuadorian birds and mammals collector Carlos Olalla.

The genus Olallamys contains two species:

- Olallamys albicauda (White-tailed olalla rat)
- Olallamys edax (Greedy olalla rat)

== Phylogeny ==
Olallamys is a member of the Echimyini clade of arboreal Echimyidae rodents. The closest relative of Olallamys is Dactylomys, and then Kannabateomys. These South American bamboo rats share unique features and are grouped under the informal clade name of "Dactylomyines". The dactylomyines are the sister genera to Diplomys and Santamartamys. All these taxa are closely related to the genera Echimys, Phyllomys, Makalata, Pattonomys, and Toromys. In turn, these genera share phylogenetic affinities with the clade containing Lonchothrix and Mesomys, and with Isothrix.

Genus-level cladogram of the Echimyini.

- Echimyini
  - Isothrix
  - - "Eumysopines"
      - Lonchothrix
        (Tuft-tailed spiny tree-rat)
      - Mesomys
    - - - - Pattonomys
          - Toromys
            (Giant tree-rat)
        - - Makalata
          - - Echimys
            - Phyllomys
      - - - Diplomys
          - Santamartamys
            (Red-crested tree-rat)
        - "Dactylomyines"
          - Kannabateomys
            (Atlantic bamboo rat)
          - - Dactylomys
            - Olallamys

The cladogram has been reconstructed from mitochondrial and nuclear DNA characters.
