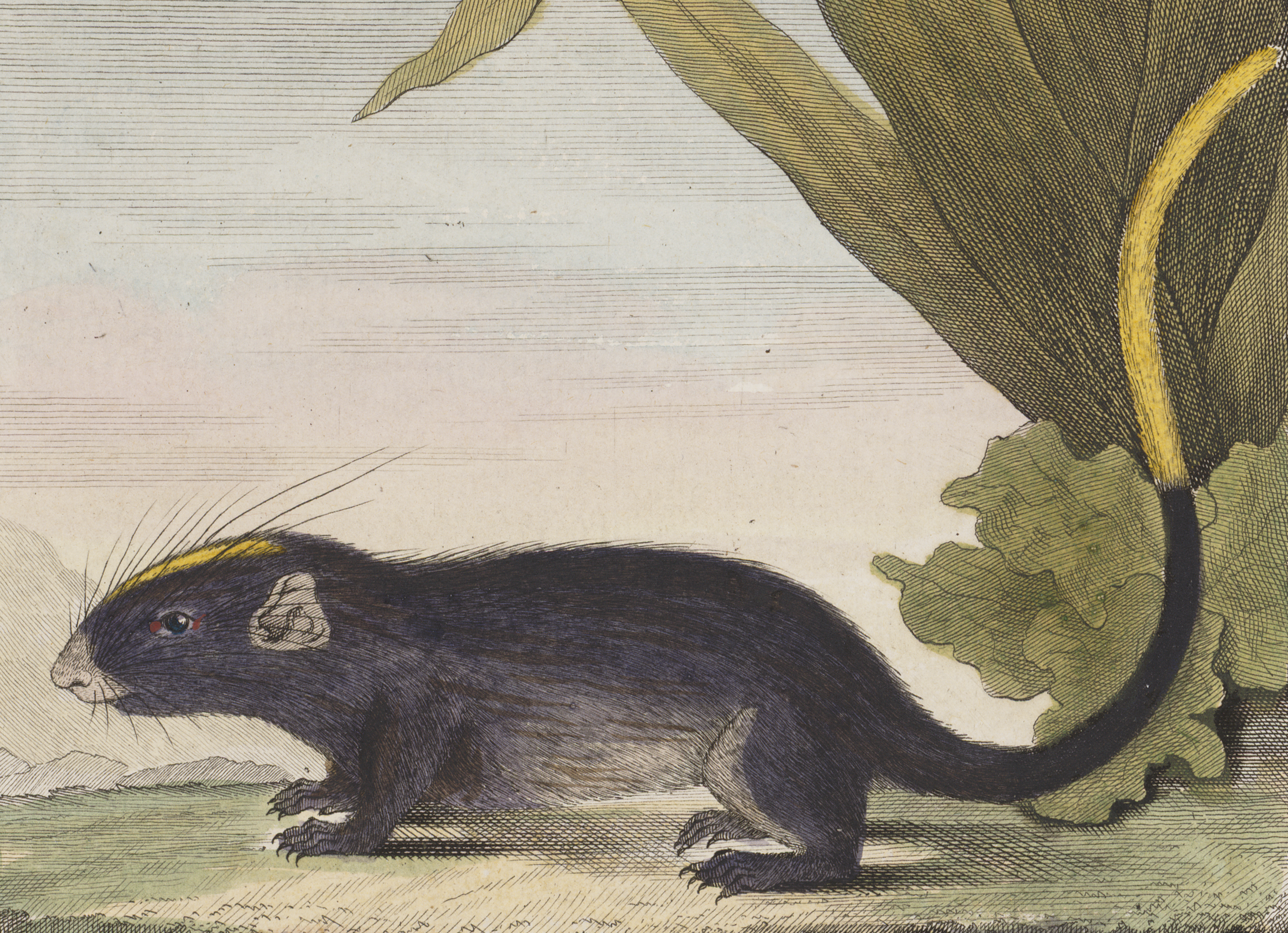
- Echimys chrysurus

Scientific classification
- Kingdom: Animalia
- Phylum: Chordata
- Class: Mammalia
- Infraclass: Placentalia
- Order: Rodentia
- Family: Echimyidae
- Subfamily: Echimyinae
- Tribe: Echimyini
- Genus: Echimys; F. Cuvier, 1809

Type species
- Myoxus chrysurus Zimmermann, 1780

Species
- Echimys chrysurus Echimys saturnus Echimys vieirai
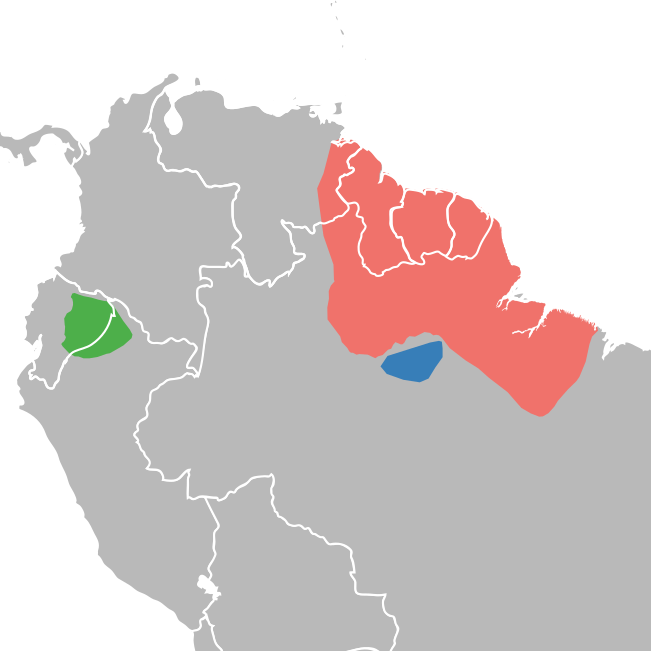
- Echimys distribution E. chrysurus in red, E. vieirai in blue, E. saturnus in green

Synonyms
- Echinomys Wagner, 1840; Loncheres Illiger, 1811; Nelomys Jourdan, 1837

= Echimys =

Echimys Temporal range: Pleistocene to Recent

Genus of mammals belonging to the spiny rat family of rodents

Echimys is a genus of the spiny rats family, the Echimyidae. Members of this genus are collectively called spiny tree-rats.

The genus name Echimys, and also its synonym Echinomys, derive from Ancient Greek ἐχῖνος (ekhînos), meaning "hedgehog", and μῦς (mûs), meaning "rat, mouse".

== Classification ==
The genus contains three extant species

- White-faced spiny tree-rat - Echimys chrysurus
- Dark spiny tree-rat - Echimys saturnus
- Vieira's spiny tree-rat - Echimys vieirai

Members of the genera Callistomys, Makalata, Pattonomys, and Phyllomys were all formerly considered part of the genus Echimys.

== Distribution ==
The members of genus Echimys are all found in northern South America, though both the dark spiny tree-rat (Echimys saturnus) and Vieira's spiny tree-rat (E. vieirai) have smaller extents of occurrence than does the white-faced spiny tree-rat (E. chrysurus). E. saturnus is found in the foothills and lowlands of Ecuador and northern Peru, while E. vieirai is only known from the Amazonas and Pará states of Brazil, south of the Amazon River.

== Phylogeny ==
Echimys is the sister genus to Phyllomys, and then to Makalata. These taxa are closely related to the genera Pattonomys and Toromys. In turn, these five genera share phylogenetic affinities with a clade containing the bamboo rats Dactylomys, Olallamys, Kannabateomys together with Diplomys and Santamartamys.

Genus-level cladogram of the Echimyini.

- Echimyini
  - Isothrix
  - - "Eumysopines"
      - Lonchothrix
        (Tuft-tailed spiny tree-rat)
      - Mesomys
    - - - - Pattonomys
          - Toromys
            (Giant tree-rat)
        - - Makalata
          - - Echimys
            - Phyllomys
      - - - Diplomys
          - Santamartamys
            (Red-crested tree-rat)
        - "Dactylomyines"
          - Kannabateomys
            (Atlantic bamboo rat)
          - - Dactylomys
            - Olallamys

The cladogram has been reconstructed from mitochondrial and nuclear DNA characters.
