= Tuft-tailed spiny tree-rat =

Conservation status
- Least Concern (IUCN 3.1)

Scientific classification
- Kingdom: Animalia
- Phylum: Chordata
- Class: Mammalia
- Order: Rodentia
- Family: Echimyidae
- Subfamily: Echimyinae
- Tribe: Echimyini
- Genus: Lonchothrix; Thomas, 1920
- Species: L. emiliae

Binomial name
- Lonchothrix emiliae Thomas, 1920
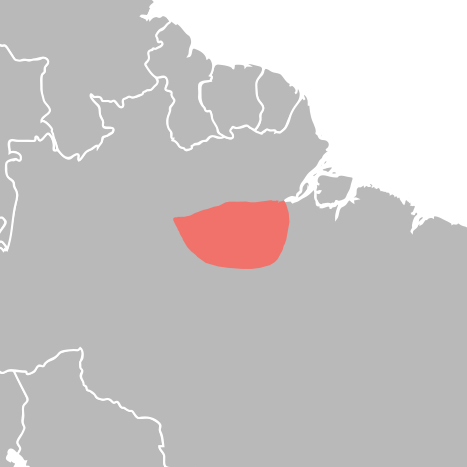
- Lonchothrix emiliae distribution

Species of mammals belonging to the spiny rat family of rodents

The tuft-tailed spiny tree rat (Lonchothrix emiliae) is a spiny rat species from Brazil south of the Amazon River, where it has been found in grassland and gallery forest. It is the only species in the genus Lonchothrix. Very little is known about this rodent. It is small with an average adult weight of about 138 grams. It is nocturnal and solitary in habits.

The genus and species were described by Oldfield Thomas in 1920. The genus name Lonchothrix derives from the two ancient greek words λόγχη (lónkhē), meaning "spear", and θρίξ, τριχός (thríx, trikhós), meaning "hair".

== Phylogeny ==
Lonchothrix is a member of the Echimyini clade of arboreal Echimyidae rodents. The closest relative of Lonchothrix is Mesomys, reflecting the fact that these taxa have once been classified in the same subfamily (Eumysopinae). These two genera share phylogenetic affinities with several taxa and clades: (i) Echimys, Phyllomys, Makalata, Pattonomys, and Toromys; (ii) the bamboo rats Dactylomys, Olallamys, Kannabateomys together with Diplomys and Santamartamys; and (iii) Isothrix.

Genus-level cladogram of the Echimyini.

- Echimyini
  - Isothrix
  - - "Eumysopines"
      - Lonchothrix
        (Tuft-tailed spiny tree-rat)
      - Mesomys
    - - - - Pattonomys
          - Toromys
            (Giant tree-rat)
        - - Makalata
          - - Echimys
            - Phyllomys
      - - - Diplomys
          - Santamartamys
            (Red-crested tree-rat)
        - "Dactylomyines"
          - Kannabateomys
            (Atlantic bamboo rat)
          - - Dactylomys
            - Olallamys

The cladogram has been reconstructed from mitochondrial and nuclear DNA characters.
