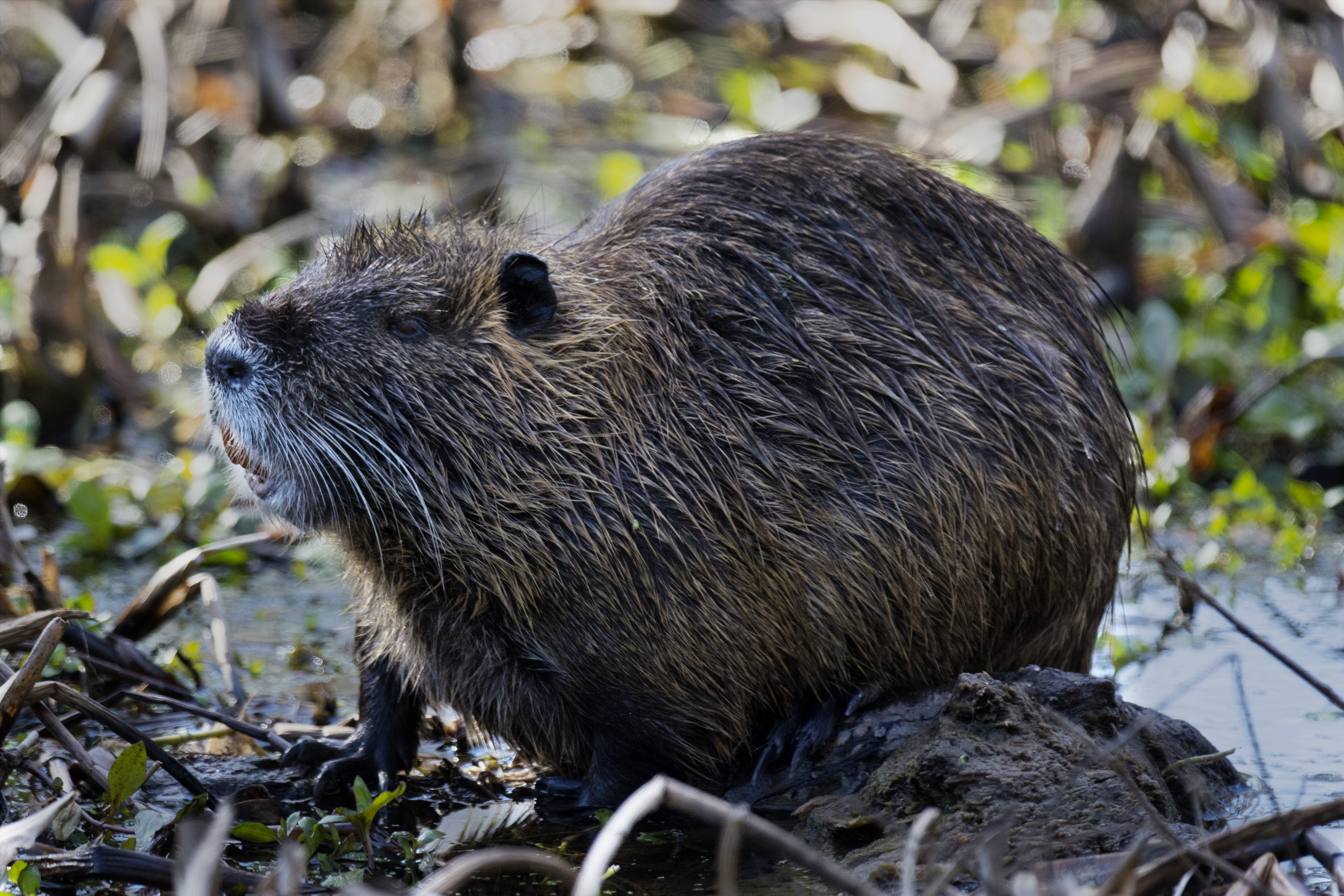
- Nutria (Myocastor coypus)

Scientific classification
- Kingdom: Animalia
- Phylum: Chordata
- Class: Mammalia
- Infraclass: Placentalia
- Order: Rodentia
- Family: Echimyidae
- Subfamily: Echimyinae
- Tribe: Myocastorini
- Genus: Myocastor; Kerr, 1792

Species
- Myocastor coypus; †Myocastor columnaris; †Myocastor obesus; †Myocastor paranensis

= Myocastor =

Myocastor Temporal range: Late Miocene - Recent

Genus of rodent

Myocastor (from Ancient Greek μῦς (mûs) 'rat, mouse', and κάστωρ (kástōr) 'beaver') is a genus of rodent that contains the living nutria (or coypu), as well as several fossil species.

== Taxonomy ==
Due to similar cranial morphology, the nutria was once considered a close relative of the Caribbean hutias and placed together with them in the family Capromyidae. Later, it was more accepted to place it in its own family, the Myocastoridae. Recent molecular studies place them in the family Echimyidae, in the tribe Myocastorini.

=== Fossil record ===
Kerber et al. (2013) recognize the following species as valid:

- Myocastor columnaris (Middle Pleistocene)
- Myocastor obesus (Late Miocene)
- Myocastor paranensis (Late Miocene)

Other species described but no longer considered valid include Myocastor minor, Myocastor perditus, and Myocastor priscus.
