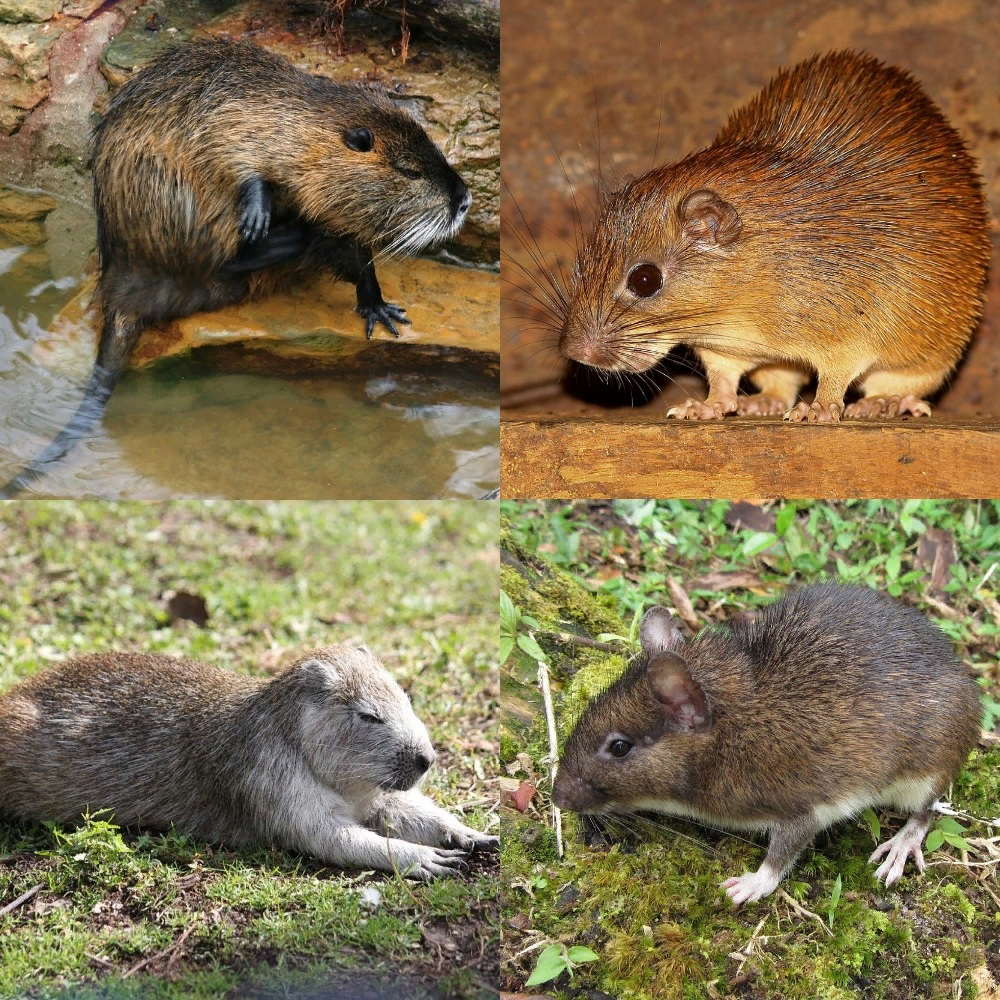
- Several members of the Echimyidae. From top-left, clockwise: Nutria, Ferreira's spiny tree-rat, Atlantic spiny rat, Desmarest's hutia.

Scientific classification
- Kingdom: Animalia
- Phylum: Chordata
- Class: Mammalia
- Order: Rodentia
- Suborder: Hystricomorpha
- Infraorder: Hystricognathi
- Parvorder: Caviomorpha
- Superfamily: Octodontoidea
- Family: Echimyidae; Gray, 1825

Type genus
- Echimys F. Cuvier, 1809

Subfamilies
- Capromyinae; Echimyinae; Euryzygomatomyinae; Carterodontinae †Adelphomyinae †Eumysopinae †Heteropsomyinae
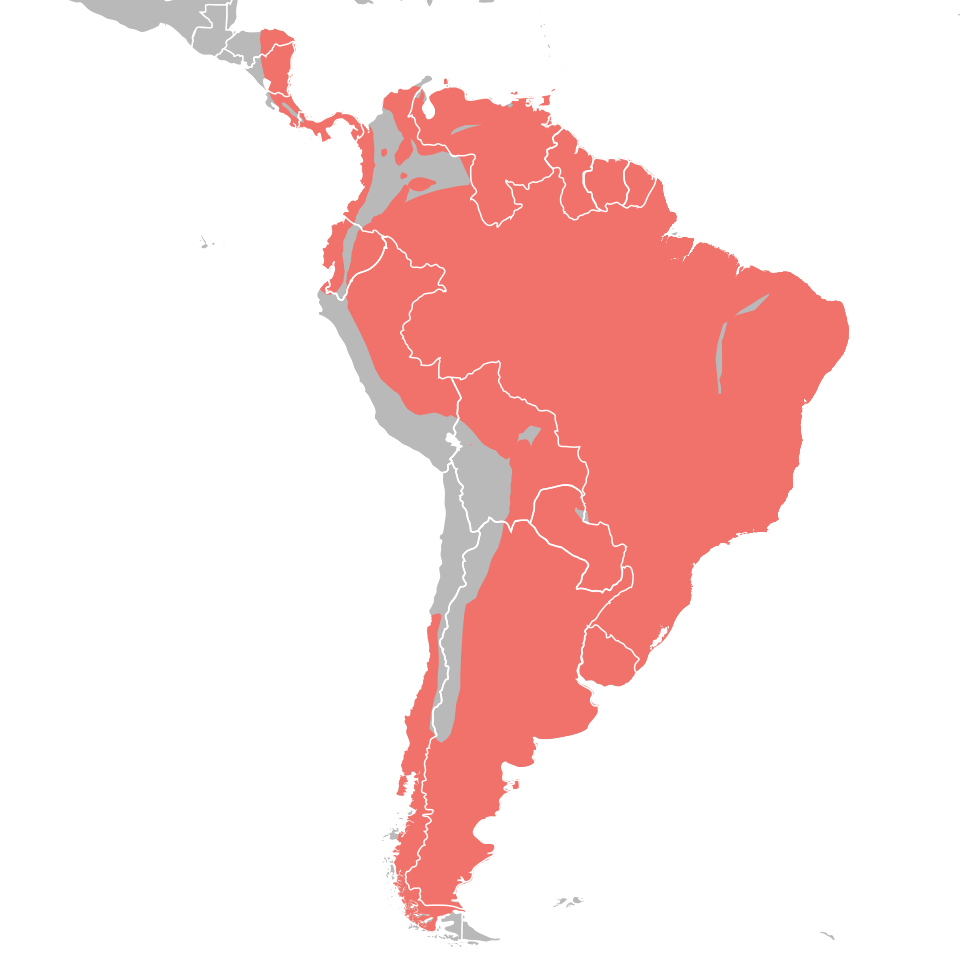
- Echimyidae distribution. Excludes introduced range of Myocaster in United States, Europe, and Japan.

Audio
- Calls of Dactylomys dactylinus

= Echimyidae =

Echimyidae Temporal range: Late Oligocene–Recent

Family of rodents

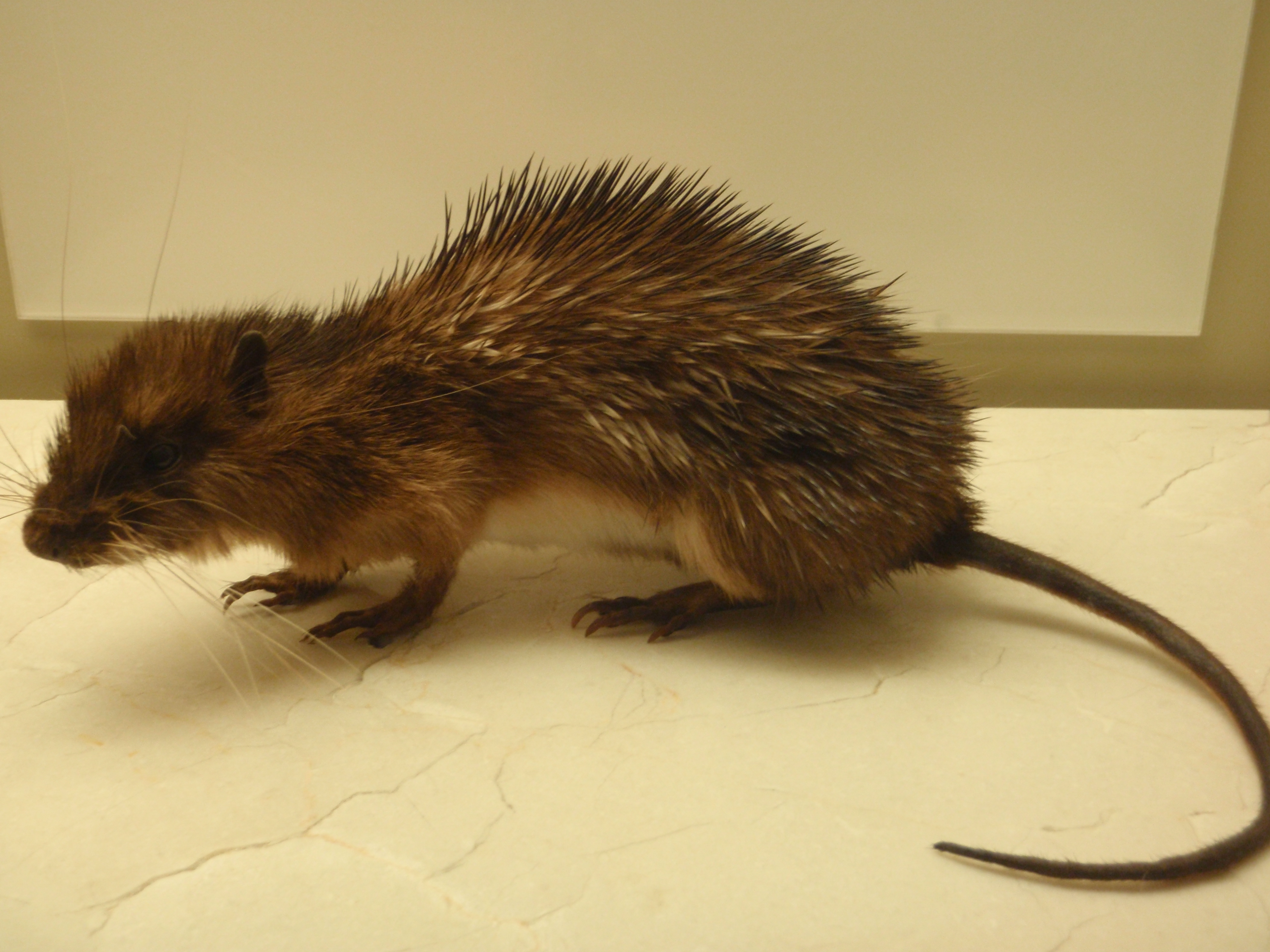
Armored rat, Hoplomys gymnurus

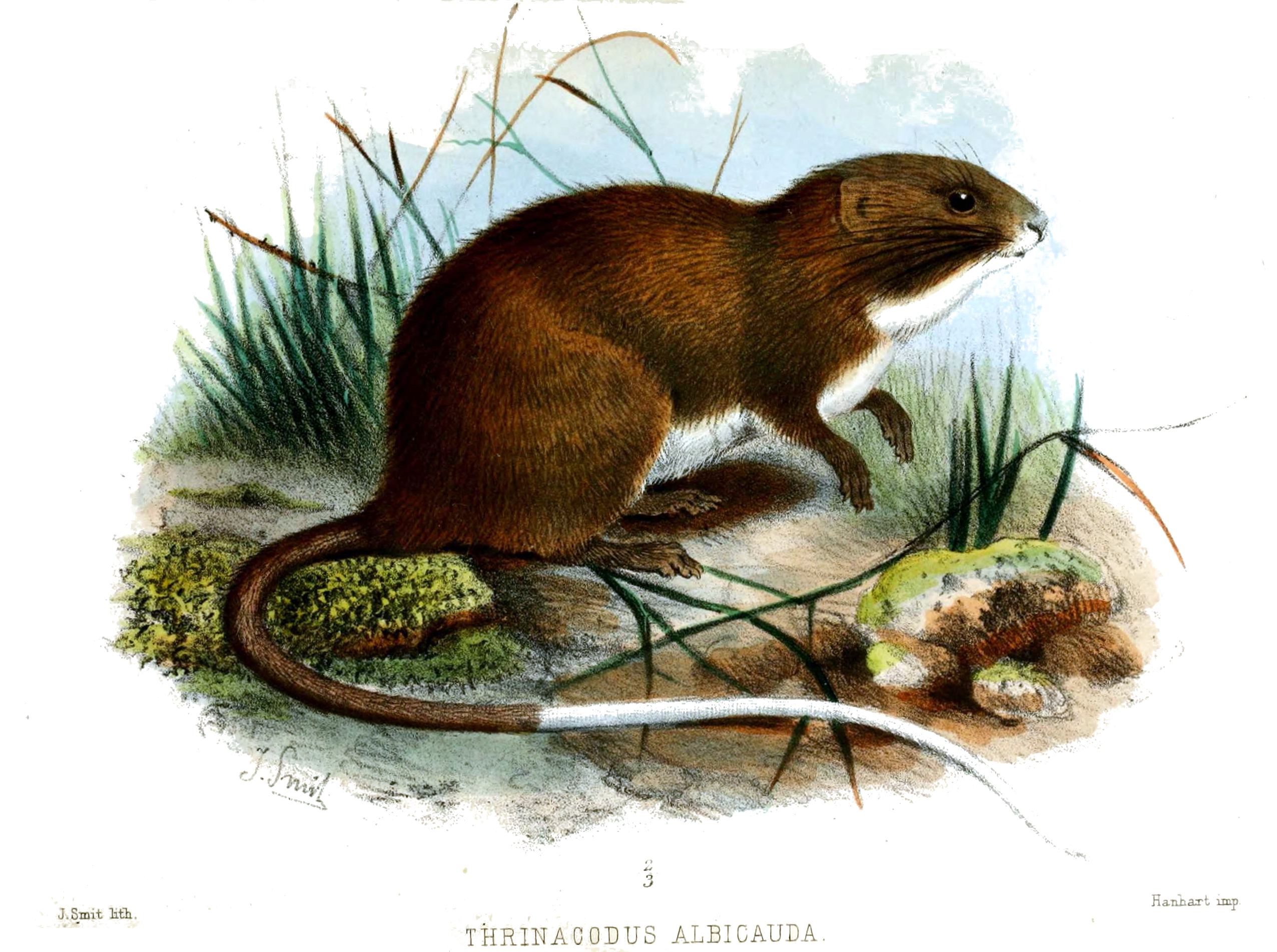
White-tailed olalla rat, Olallamys albicauda

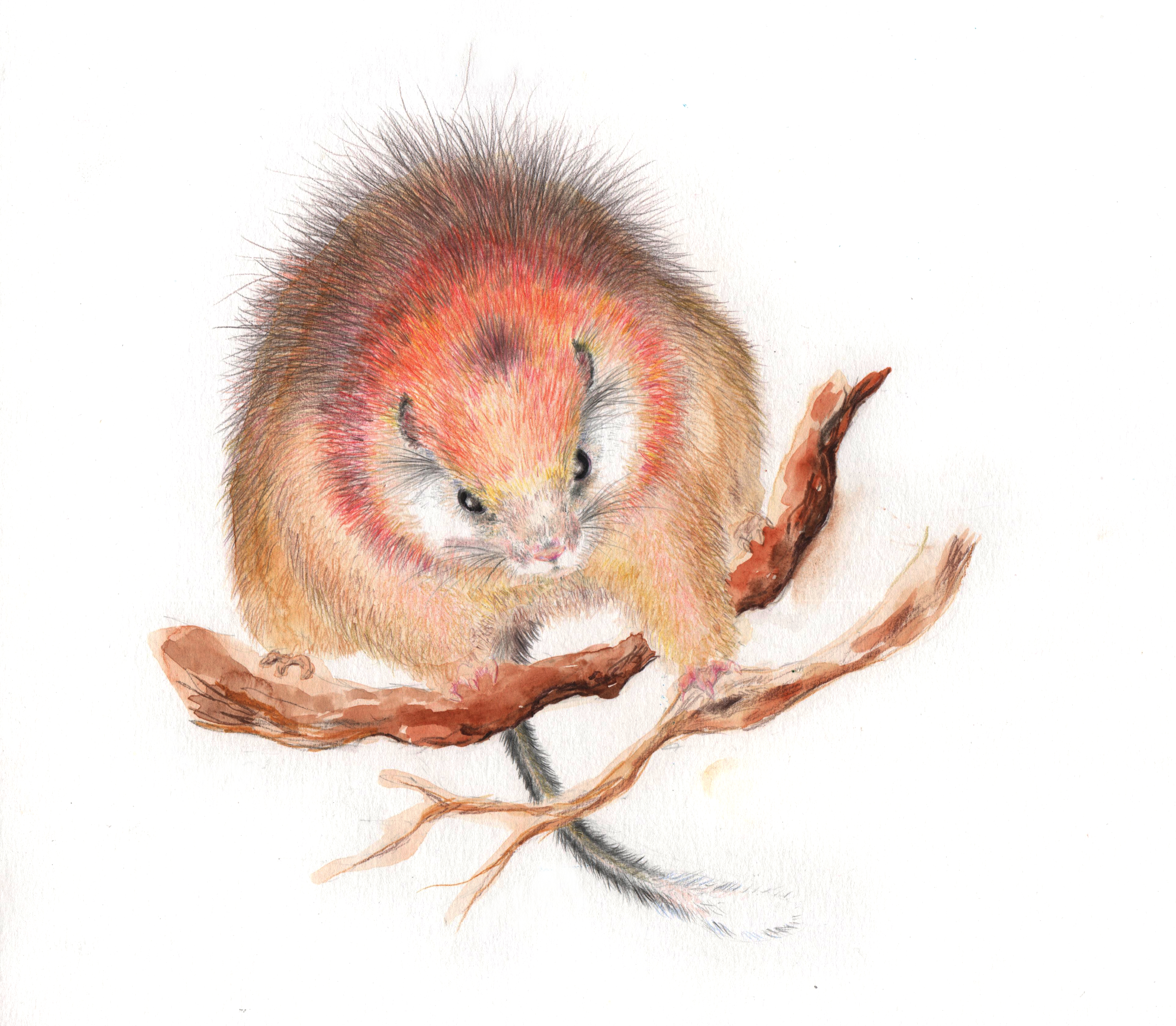
Red-crested tree rat, Santamartamys rufodorsalis

Echimyidae (from Ancient Greek ἐχῖνος (ekhînos), meaning "hedgehog", and μῦς (mûs), meaning "rat, mouse") is the family of Neotropical spiny rats and their fossil relatives. This is the most species-rich family of hystricognath rodents. It is probably also the most ecologically diverse, with members ranging from fully arboreal to terrestrial to fossorial to semiaquatic habits. They presently exist mainly in South America; three members of the family also range into Central America, and the hutias are found in the West Indies in the Caribbean. Species of the extinct subfamily Heteropsomyinae formerly lived on Cuba, Hispaniola, and Puerto Rico in the Antilles.

== Characteristics ==
In general form, most spiny rats resemble rats, although they are more closely related to guinea pigs and chinchillas. Most species have stiff, pointed hairs, or spines, that presumably serve for protection from predators.

Many echimyids can break off their tails when attacked. Losing the tip of their tail is reportedly common. This action may confuse predators long enough for the spiny rat to escape. Unlike the tails of some species of lizards, however, the tails of spiny rats do not regenerate. Therefore, the tactic can only be used once in an individual's lifetime.

Most spiny rats are rare and poorly known, but a few are extremely abundant. Various species are respectively terrestrial, arboreal, or fossorial. In general, the arboreal forms are most rat-like in appearance, whilst the burrowing species are more gopher-like, with stocky bodies and short tails. Most species do poorly in conditions of high heat and aridity and are restricted to regions with abundant water. They are almost exclusively herbivorous.

== Systematics ==
The current taxonomic content of the family Echimyidae has been reshaped over time, and its organization into coherent units stems from two realizations. The first is that cladistic approaches applied to morphological characters showed that many traits used to define taxa were plesiomorphic or homoplastic. The second realization came from the advent of phylogenetic analyses of DNA sequence and protein sequence data with probability methods — maximum likelihood and Bayesian inference — leading to the identification of robust clades and the recognition of higher categorical ranks (see Phylogeny section). The following table recapitulates and compares the taxonomic content of taxa recognized on molecular and traditional basis: the two families Capromyidae and Myocastoridae, the five subfamilies Echimyinae, Euryzygomatomyinae, Capromyinae, Dactylomyinae, Eumysopinae, and the four tribes Echimyini, Myocastorini, Capromyini, and Plagiodontini.

=== Extant genera ===
- Family Echimyidae - spiny rats

Comparison between molecular-based and traditional systematics for extant Echimyidae and Capromyidae genera
Genus	Vernacular name	Molecular-based subfamily	Molecular-based tribe	Traditional systematics
Echimys	arboreal spiny rats	Echimyinae	Echimyini	Echimyinae
Phyllomys	Atlantic tree-rats	Echimyinae	Echimyini	Echimyinae
Makalata	—	Echimyinae	Echimyini	Echimyinae
Pattonomys	—	Echimyinae	Echimyini	Echimyinae
Toromys	giant tree-rat	Echimyinae	Echimyini	Echimyinae
Diplomys	—	Echimyinae	Echimyini	Echimyinae
Santamartamys	red-crested tree-rat	Echimyinae	Echimyini	Echimyinae
Isothrix	toros or brush-tailed rats	Echimyinae	Echimyini	Echimyinae
Dactylomys	bamboo rats	Echimyinae	Echimyini	Dactylomyinae
Olallamys	olalla rats	Echimyinae	Echimyini	Dactylomyinae
Kannabateomys	Atlantic bamboo rat	Echimyinae	Echimyini	Dactylomyinae
Lonchothrix	tuft-tailed spiny tree-rat	Echimyinae	Echimyini	Eumysopinae
Mesomys	spiny tree-rats	Echimyinae	Echimyini	Eumysopinae
Callistomys	painted tree-rat	Echimyinae	Myocastorini	Echimyinae
Myocastor	coypu, nutria	Echimyinae	Myocastorini	Myocastoridae
Thrichomys	punaré	Echimyinae	Myocastorini	Eumysopinae
Hoplomys	armored rat	Echimyinae	Myocastorini	Eumysopinae
Proechimys	spiny rats	Echimyinae	Myocastorini	Eumysopinae
Trinomys	Atlantic spiny rats	Euryzygomatomyinae	—	Eumysopinae
Euryzygomatomys	guiara	Euryzygomatomyinae	—	Eumysopinae
Clyomys	—	Euryzygomatomyinae	—	Eumysopinae
Carterodon	Owl's spiny rat	Carterodontinae	—	Eumysopinae
Plagiodontia	—	Capromyinae	Plagiodontini	Capromyidae
Geocapromys	—	Capromyinae	Capromyini	Capromyidae
Mesocapromys	—	Capromyinae	Capromyini	Capromyidae
Mysateles	—	Capromyinae	Capromyini	Capromyidae
Capromys	Desmarest's hutia	Capromyinae	Capromyini	Capromyidae

=== Extinct genera ===
- Family Echimyidae - spiny rats
  - †Cercomys
  - †Maruchito
  - †Paulacoutomys
  - †Proclinodontomys
  - †Willidewu
  - Subfamily †Adelphomyinae
    - †Adelphomys
    - †Deseadomys
    - †Paradelphomys
    - †Ricardomys
    - †Stichomys
    - †Xylechimys
  - Subfamily †Heteropsomyinae - extinct West Indian echimyids
    - †Boromys
    - †Brotomys
    - †Heteropsomys
    - †Puertoricomys
  - Subfamily Eumysopinae
    - †Acarechimys
    - †Chasichimys
    - †Eumysops
    - †Palaeoechimys
    - †Pampamys
    - †Pattersomys
    - †Protacaremys
    - †Protadelphomys
    - †Sallamys
  - Subfamily Capromyinae - hutias
    - †Hexolobodon
    - †Hyperplagiodontia
    - †Isolobodon
    - †Rhizoplagiodontia

=== About Chaetomys ===
The bristle-spined rat, Chaetomys subspinosus, has sometimes been classified in Echimyidae, although traditionally considered a member of the New World porcupine family Erethizontidae. The classification with Echimyidae is supported by similarities in the cheek teeth structure. Like all living caviomorphs except erethizontids, Chaetomys seems to lack posterior carotid foramina, and together with all echimyids and in contrast to all other caviomorphs, Chaetomys seems to retain the otherwise deciduous premolars (dP4). Some of these characters have been, however, reinterpreted as evidence for affinities between Chaetomys and the Erethizontidae. A molecular phylogeny based on the mitochondrial gene coding for cytochrome b combined to karyological evidence actually suggests Chaetomys is more closely related to the Erethizontidae than to the Echimyidae, although it branches as the sister group to the rest of the Erethizontidae.

== Phylogeny ==
The phylogenetic tree of the Echimyidae shows a major split between the subfamily Echimyinae and an assemblage containing the Euryzygomatomyinae, Carterodon, and the Capromyidae. The first major clade contains a majority of arboreal genera (e.g., Phyllomys, Dactylomys, and Mesomys), a few terrestrial taxa (e.g., Proechimys), and a subaquatic one (Myocastor). The second major clade includes fossorial genera (e.g., Euryzygomatomys or Carterodon), a terrestrial one (Trinomys), and members inhabiting the Caribbean islands (Capromyidae).

Genus-level cladogram of the Echimyidae (including members of the family Capromyidae).

- Echimyidae
  - - Euryzygomatomyinae
      - Trinomys
      - - Clyomys
        - Euryzygomatomys
    - - Carterodon
      - Capromyidae
        - Plagiodontini
          Plagiodontia
        - Capromyini
          - Geocapromys
          - - Capromys
            - - Mesocapromys
              - Mysateles
  - Echimyinae
    - Myocastorini
      - - Thrichomys
        - - Hoplomys
          - Proechimys
      - - Myocastor
        - Callistomys
    - Echimyini
      - Isothrix
      - - - Lonchothrix
          - Mesomys
        - - - - Pattonomys
              - Toromys
            - - Makalata
              - - Echimys
                - Phyllomys
          - - - Diplomys
              - Santamartamys
            - "Dactylomyines"
              - Kannabateomys
              - - Dactylomys
                - Olallamys

The cladogram has been reconstructed from mitochondrial and nuclear DNA characters. The green bar shows the polyphyly of the arboreal taxa, due to closer affinities of Callistomys with Myocastorini rather than with Echimyini. The red bar shows the polyphyly of the fossorial taxa, due to closer affinities of Carterodon with Capromyidae rather than with Euryzygomatomyinae. Carterodon has recently (2019) been classified in its own subfamily Carterodontinae.
