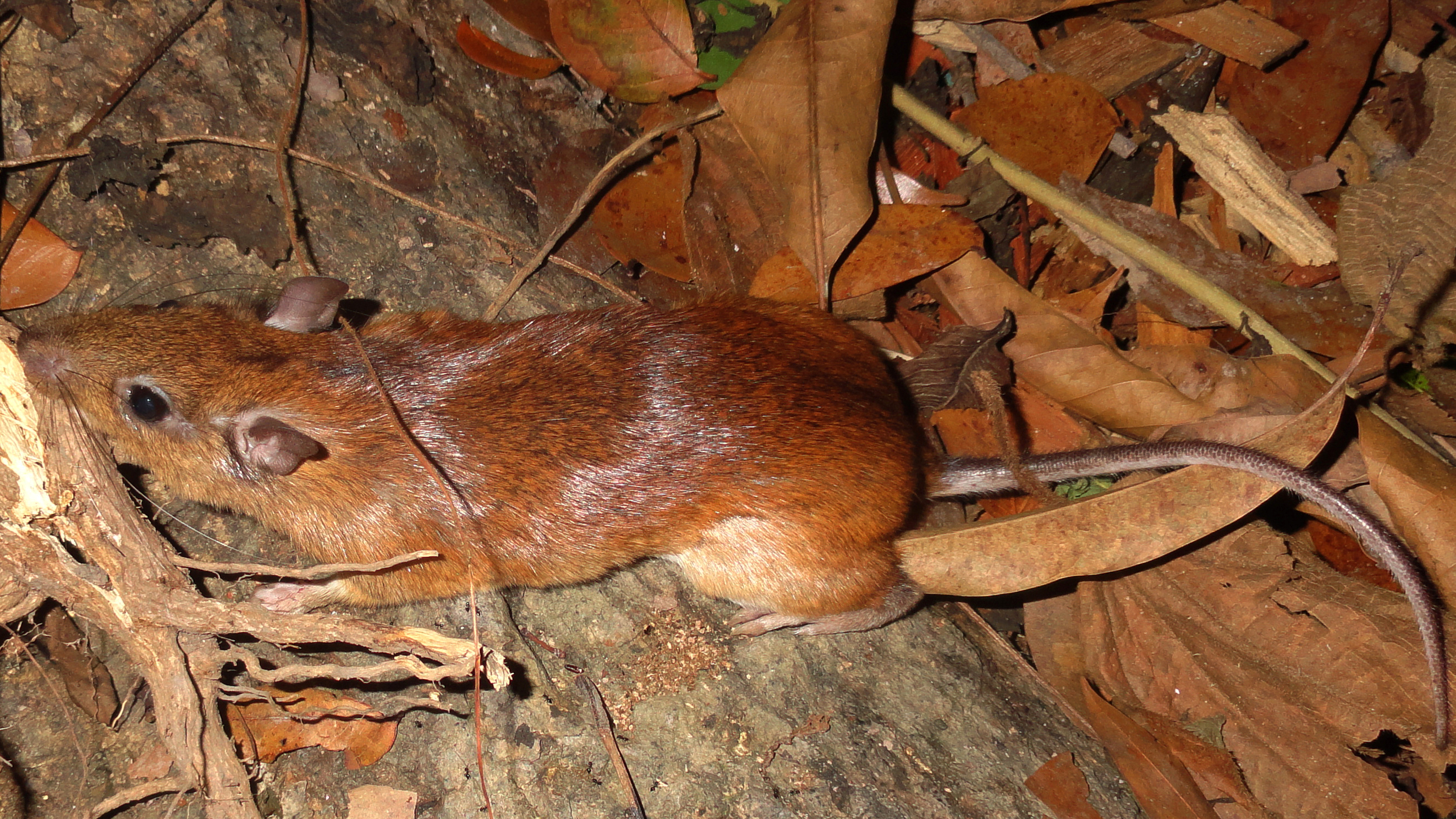

Conservation status
- Least Concern (IUCN 3.1)

Scientific classification
- Kingdom: Animalia
- Phylum: Chordata
- Class: Mammalia
- Order: Rodentia
- Family: Echimyidae
- Subfamily: Echimyinae
- Tribe: Myocastorini
- Genus: Proechimys
- Species: P. longicaudatus

Binomial name
- Proechimys longicaudatus (Rengger, 1830)

= Long-tailed spiny rat =

Species of mammals belonging to the spiny rat family of rodents

The long-tailed spiny rat (Proechimys longicaudatus) is a spiny rat species found in Bolivia, Brazil and Paraguay.

== Description ==
The long-tailed spiny rat is a large rat with a head-and-body length of between 187 and 250 mm (7.4 and 9.8 in) and a tail length of 121 to 200 mm (4.8 to 7.9 in). The fur is less bristly than in other related species. The upper parts are a glossy chestnut colour becoming more orange on the flanks. The underparts are white, and there is a clear line separating upper and lower parts. The tail is chestnut above and pale below. The tails are missing on some individuals, reflecting the lizard-like ability of many echimyids to detach their tails when attacked by predators.

== Distribution and habitat ==
This species has a range in South America extending from southern Bolivia and northern Paraguay to western and central Brazil. It is terrestrial and inhabits dry primary and secondary forest, as well as cerrado and habitats with cleared areas and patches of forest. It usually occurs at altitudes below 500 m (1,600 ft) but has been recorded up to about 1,000 m (3,300 ft).

== Ecology ==
A study was undertaken in Bolivia to establish which small rodents were reservoir hosts for Leishmania, the causal agent for the human disease leishmaniasis. It was found that Oryzomys nitida and Oryzomys acritus were often implicated but that P. longicaudatus did not harbour the infection.

== Phylogeny ==
Morphological characters and mitochondrial cytochrome b DNA sequences showed that P. longicaudatus belongs to the so-called longicaudatus group of Proechimys species, and shares closer phylogenetic affinities with the other members of this clade: P. brevicauda and P. cuvieri.

Species-level cladogram of the genus Proechimys.

- Myocastorini
  - Hoplomys
    Hoplomys gymnurus
  - Proechimys
    - Proechimys canicollis (Colombian spiny rat)
    - Proechimys decumanus (Pacific spiny rat)
    - Proechimys echinothrix (Stiff-spine spiny rat)
    - Proechimys simonsi (Simon's spiny rat)
    - group gardneri
      - Proechimys kulinae (Kulina spiny rat)
      - - Proechimys gardneri (Gardner's spiny rat)
        - Proechimys pattoni (Patton's spiny rat)
    - group semispinosus
      - Proechimys gorgonae
      - Proechimys oconnelli (O'Connell's spiny rat)
      - Proechimys semispinosus (Tome's spiny rat)
    - group guyannensis
      - Proechimys boimensis
      - Proechimys guyannensis (Guyenne spiny rat)
      - Proechimys oris
      - Proechimys roberti (Roberto's spiny rat)
    - group longicaudatus
      - Proechimys cuvieri (Cuvier's spiny rat)
      - - Proechimys brevicauda (Short-tailed spiny rat)
        - Proechimys gularis
        - Proechimys longicaudatus (Long-tailed spiny rat)
    - group goeldii
      - Proechimys amphichoricus
      - Proechimys goeldii (Goeldi's spiny rat)
      - Proechimys hyleae
      - Proechimys quadruplicatus (Napo spiny rat)
      - Proechimys steerei (Steere's spiny rat)
    - group trinitatus
      - Proechimys chrysaeolus (Boyacá spiny rat)
      - Proechimys guairae (Guaira spiny rat)
      - Proechimys hoplomyoides (Guyanan spiny rat)
      - Proechimys magdalenae (Magdalena spiny rat)
      - Proechimys mincae (Minca spiny rat)
      - Proechimys poliopus (Gray-footed spiny rat)
      - Proechimys trinitatus (Trinidad spiny rat)
      - Proechimys urichi (Sucre spiny rat)

The cladogram has been reconstructed from morphological characters and mitochondrial DNA (cytochrome b) sequences.

== Status ==
The long-tailed spiny rat is a common and adaptable species, being able to tolerate some degree of habitat modification. The dry forests in this part of South America are being cleared for agricultural purposes and it is thought the population trend of this rat is downwards. However, it has a wide range, and a presumed large total population, and the rate of decline is slow, so the International Union for Conservation of Nature has rated its conservation status as being of "least concern".
