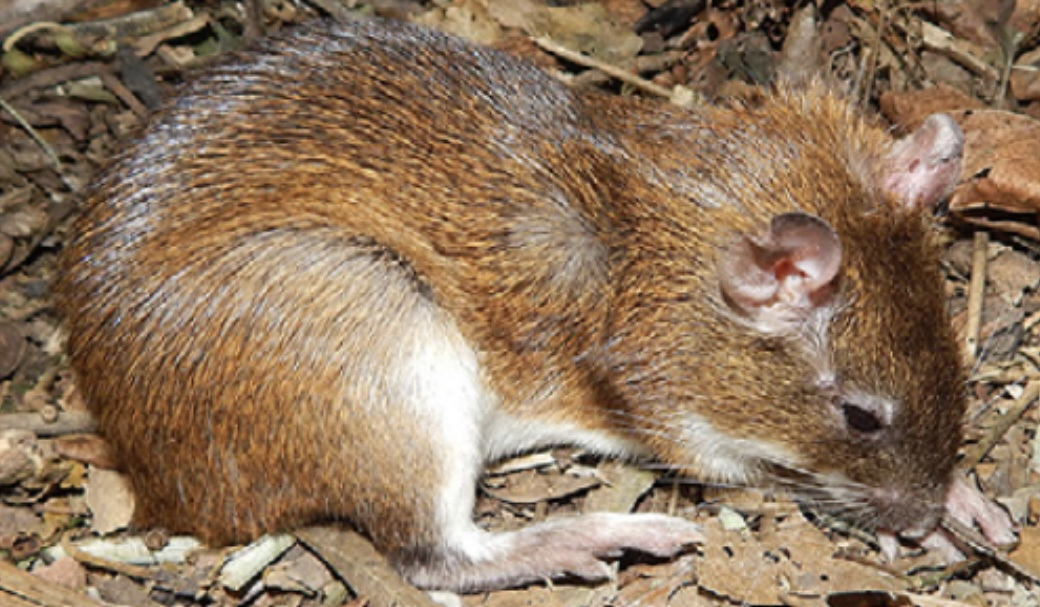

Conservation status
- Least Concern (IUCN 3.1)

Scientific classification
- Kingdom: Animalia
- Phylum: Chordata
- Class: Mammalia
- Order: Rodentia
- Family: Echimyidae
- Subfamily: Echimyinae
- Tribe: Myocastorini
- Genus: Proechimys
- Species: P. brevicauda

Binomial name
- Proechimys brevicauda (Günther, 1877)

Synonyms
- P. bolivianus Thomas, 1901; P. gularis Thomas, 1911

= Short-tailed spiny rat =

Short-tailed spiny-rat

Species of mammal

The short-tailed spiny-rat (Proechimys brevicauda) or Huallaga spiny rat, is a spiny rat species found in Bolivia, Brazil, Colombia, Ecuador and Peru.

== Phylogeny ==
Morphological characters and mitochondrial cytochrome b DNA sequences showed that P. brevicauda belongs to the so-called longicaudatus group of Proechimys species, and shares closer phylogenetic affinities with the other members of this clade: P. longicaudatus and P. cuvieri.

Species-level cladogram of the genus Proechimys.

- Myocastorini
  - Hoplomys
    Hoplomys gymnurus
  - Proechimys
    - Proechimys canicollis (Colombian spiny rat)
    - Proechimys decumanus (Pacific spiny rat)
    - Proechimys echinothrix (Stiff-spine spiny rat)
    - Proechimys simonsi (Simon's spiny rat)
    - group gardneri
      - Proechimys kulinae (Kulina spiny rat)
      - - Proechimys gardneri (Gardner's spiny rat)
        - Proechimys pattoni (Patton's spiny rat)
    - group semispinosus
      - Proechimys gorgonae
      - Proechimys oconnelli (O'Connell's spiny rat)
      - Proechimys semispinosus (Tome's spiny rat)
    - group guyannensis
      - Proechimys boimensis
      - Proechimys guyannensis (Guyenne spiny rat)
      - Proechimys oris
      - Proechimys roberti (Roberto's spiny rat)
    - group longicaudatus
      - Proechimys cuvieri (Cuvier's spiny rat)
      - - Proechimys brevicauda (Short-tailed spiny rat)
        - Proechimys gularis
        - Proechimys longicaudatus (Long-tailed spiny rat)
    - group goeldii
      - Proechimys amphichoricus
      - Proechimys goeldii (Goeldi's spiny rat)
      - Proechimys hyleae
      - Proechimys quadruplicatus (Napo spiny rat)
      - Proechimys steerei (Steere's spiny rat)
    - group trinitatus
      - Proechimys chrysaeolus (Boyacá spiny rat)
      - Proechimys guairae (Guaira spiny rat)
      - Proechimys hoplomyoides (Guyanan spiny rat)
      - Proechimys magdalenae (Magdalena spiny rat)
      - Proechimys mincae (Minca spiny rat)
      - Proechimys poliopus (Gray-footed spiny rat)
      - Proechimys trinitatus (Trinidad spiny rat)
      - Proechimys urichi (Sucre spiny rat)

The cladogram has been reconstructed from morphological characters and mitochondrial DNA (cytochrome b) sequences.
