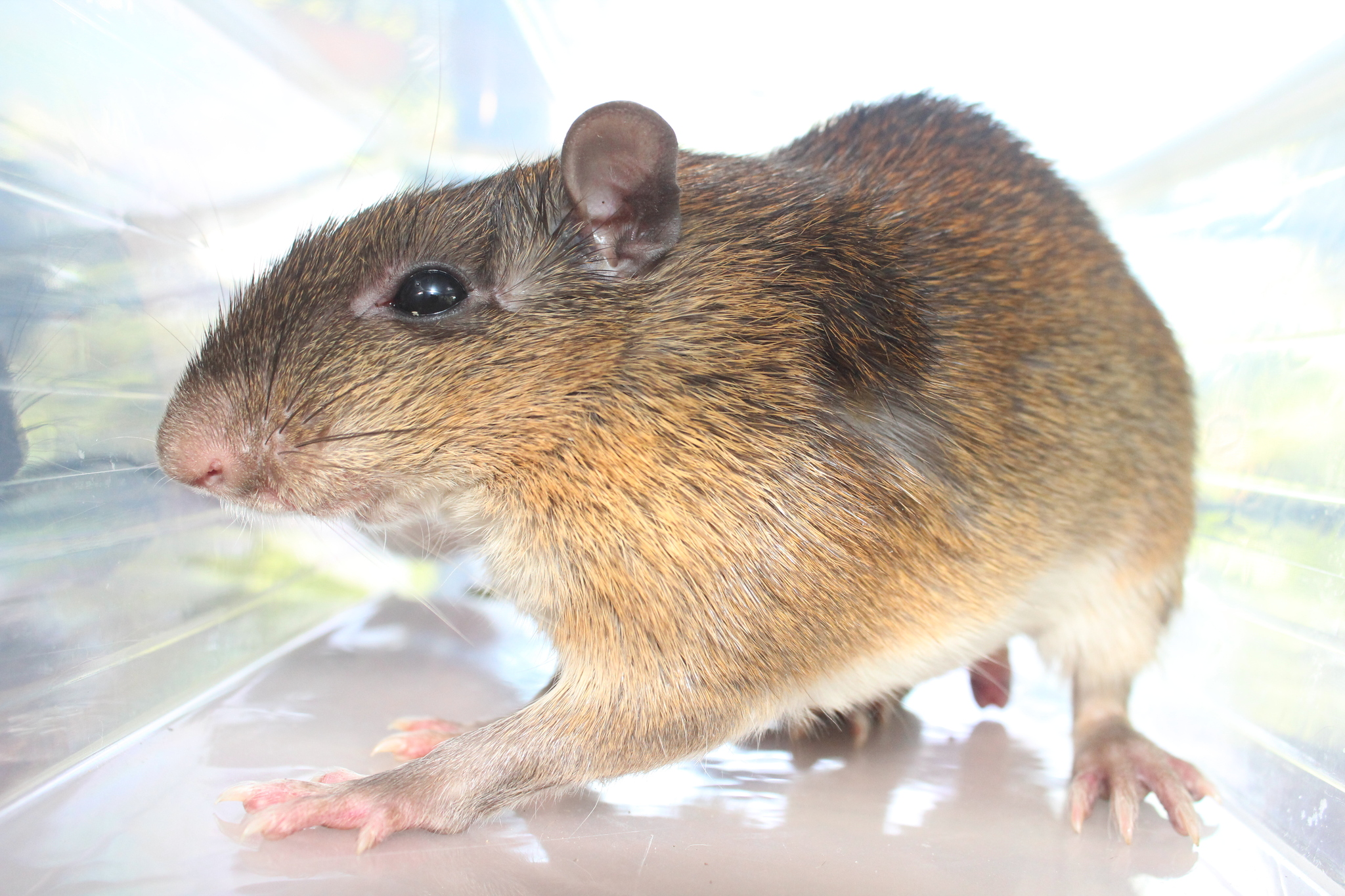

Conservation status
- Least Concern (IUCN 3.1)

Scientific classification
- Kingdom: Animalia
- Phylum: Chordata
- Class: Mammalia
- Order: Rodentia
- Family: Echimyidae
- Tribe: Myocastorini
- Genus: Proechimys
- Species: P. semispinosus

Binomial name
- Proechimys semispinosus (Tomes, 1860)

Subspecies
- P. s. burrus Bangs, 1901; P. s. calidior Thomas, 1911; P. s. centralis (Thomas, 1896); P. s. colombianus Thomas, 1914; P. s. goldmani Bole, 1937; P. s. ignotus Kellogg, 1946; P. s. panamensis Thomas, 1900; P. s. rosa Thomas, 1900; P. s. rubellus Hollister, 1914; P. s. semispinosus (Tomes, 1860)
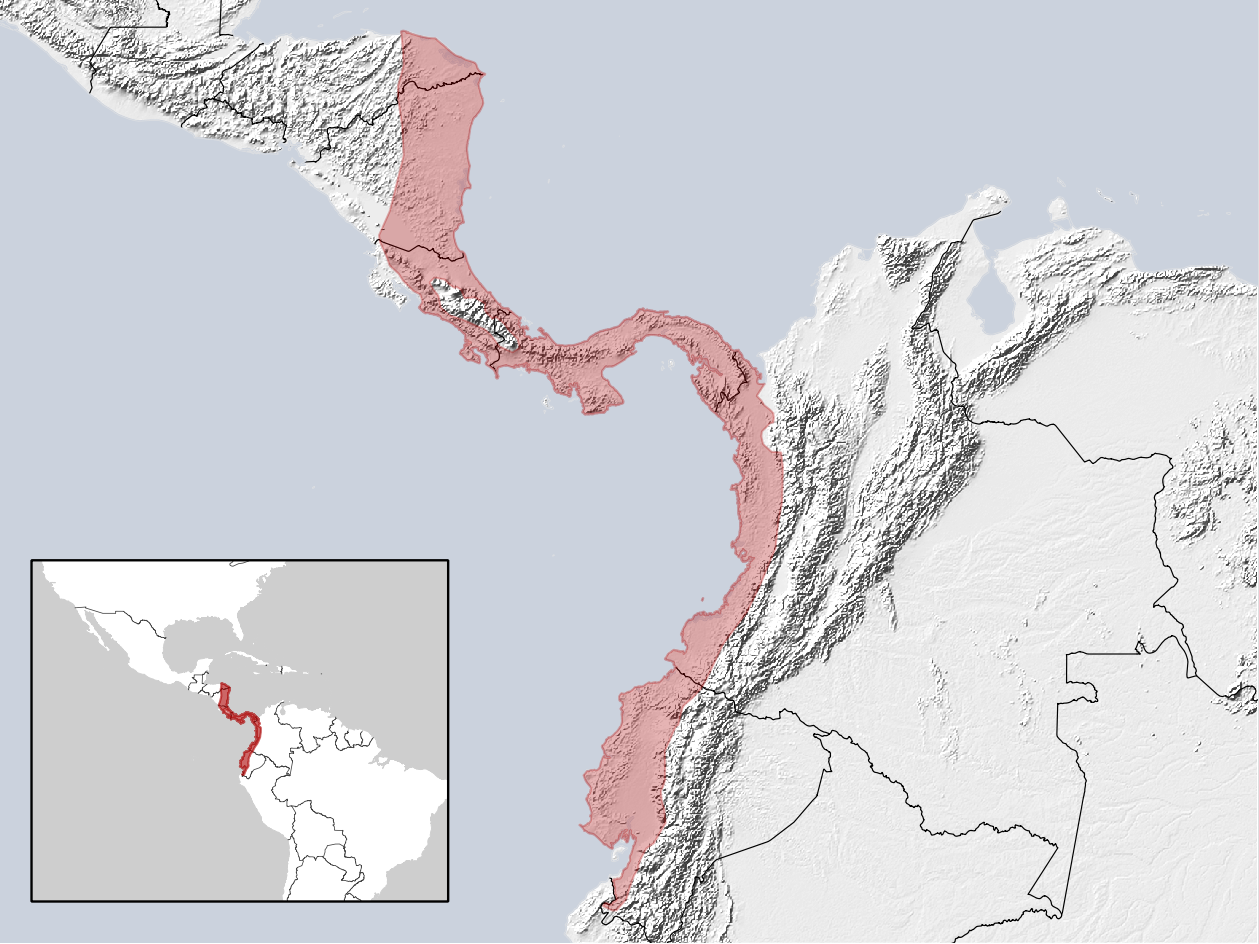

Synonyms
- Proechimys gorgonae Bangs, 1905

= Tome's spiny rat =

Tome's spiny-rat

Species of spiny rat

Tome's spiny rat (Proechimys semispinosus), also known as Tomes' spiny rat or the Central American spiny rat, is a species of spiny rat distributed from Honduras to Ecuador. The IUCN has assessed its conservation status as being of "least concern".

== Description ==
Tome's spiny rat is a large rat with a head-and-body length of between 220 and 280 mm (8.7 and 11.0 in) and a tail length of between 175 and 192 mm (6.9 and 7.6 in). The head is long and slender, with prominent eyes and narrow erect ears. At night, the eyes reflect a reddish eyeshine. The feet are long with strong nails. The pelage is sleek with spines mixed in with the dorsal fur, though these are not very obvious in the field. The upper parts are reddish-brown while the underparts are white. The tail is almost hairless and is reddish-brown above and white below. About 20% of animals encountered have no tail. This rat could be confused with the armored rat (Hoplomys gymnurus) which is much the same size, but the armored rat has a longer snout and smaller eyes, which are less reflective at night. Other terrestrial rats are considerably smaller and mostly have tails that are longer than their head-and-body lengths.

Its karyotype has 2n = 30 and FN = 50-54.

== Distribution ==
The range of Tome's spiny rat extends from southeastern Honduras to southwestern Ecuador and possibly to northern Peru. It generally keeps below 800 m (2,620 ft) but in Ecuador may be found a little higher. It is a common species in evergreen and deciduous forest, favouring riparian corridors and low-lying areas. It is a tolerant and adaptable species, and the International Union for Conservation of Nature has assessed its conservation status as being of "least concern".

== Ecology ==
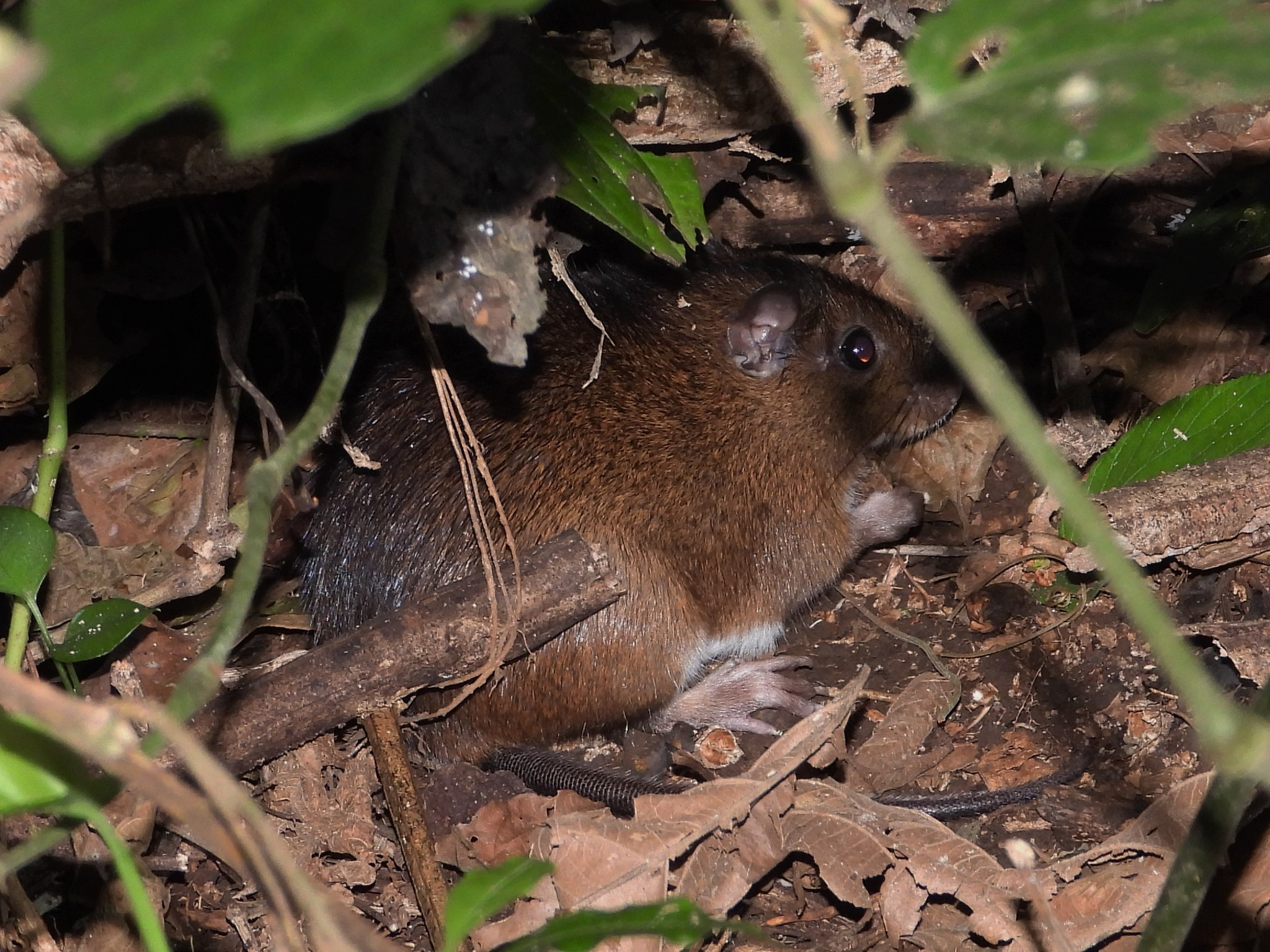
Proechimys semispinosus in La Fortuna, San Carlos, Costa Rica

Tome's spiny rat is a nocturnal, mainly ground-dwelling rat. During the day it may hide in a burrow or under a fallen tree, in a hollow log or in dense vegetation. At night it moves slowly and often sits stationary beside a tree buttress or log. It may freeze if caught in the open. It feeds on fruits and seeds, fungi, plant material and insects, carrying larger objects to a safe place before consuming them. The females can breed four times a year, producing litters of up to five precocial young. The reproductive rate seems to be limited by the availability of food. On a group of small islands in Panama, each of which had its own range of tree species which fruited at different seasons, there were few births on each islet at times of fruit shortage and many at times of fruit abundance; the seasonal effects were even more marked when the spiny rat was the only frugivorous mammal on the island.

== Phylogeny ==
Morphological characters and mitochondrial cytochrome b DNA sequences showed that P. semispinosus belongs to the so-called semispinosus group of Proechimys species, and shares closer phylogenetic affinities with the other member of this clade: P. oconnelli.

Species-level cladogram of the genus Proechimys.

- Myocastorini
  - Hoplomys
    Hoplomys gymnurus
  - Proechimys
    - Proechimys canicollis (Colombian spiny rat)
    - Proechimys decumanus (Pacific spiny rat)
    - Proechimys echinothrix (Stiff-spine spiny rat)
    - Proechimys simonsi (Simon's spiny rat)
    - group gardneri
      - Proechimys kulinae (Kulina spiny rat)
      - - Proechimys gardneri (Gardner's spiny rat)
        - Proechimys pattoni (Patton's spiny rat)
    - group semispinosus
      - Proechimys gorgonae
      - Proechimys oconnelli (O'Connell's spiny rat)
      - Proechimys semispinosus (Tome's spiny rat)
    - group guyannensis
      - Proechimys boimensis
      - Proechimys guyannensis (Guyenne spiny rat)
      - Proechimys oris
      - Proechimys roberti (Roberto's spiny rat)
    - group longicaudatus
      - Proechimys cuvieri (Cuvier's spiny rat)
      - - Proechimys brevicauda (Short-tailed spiny rat)
        - Proechimys gularis
        - Proechimys longicaudatus (Long-tailed spiny rat)
    - group goeldii
      - Proechimys amphichoricus
      - Proechimys goeldii (Goeldi's spiny rat)
      - Proechimys hyleae
      - Proechimys quadruplicatus (Napo spiny rat)
      - Proechimys steerei (Steere's spiny rat)
    - group trinitatus
      - Proechimys chrysaeolus (Boyacá spiny rat)
      - Proechimys guairae (Guaira spiny rat)
      - Proechimys hoplomyoides (Guyanan spiny rat)
      - Proechimys magdalenae (Magdalena spiny rat)
      - Proechimys mincae (Minca spiny rat)
      - Proechimys poliopus (Gray-footed spiny rat)
      - Proechimys trinitatus (Trinidad spiny rat)
      - Proechimys urichi (Sucre spiny rat)

The cladogram has been reconstructed from morphological characters and mitochondrial DNA (cytochrome b) sequences.

== Disease ==
Tome's spiny rat can serve as a reservoir species for the trypanosomes that are responsible for the disease leishmaniasis, which is spread by sandflies and affects humans. The rat can be infected and harbour the parasite without showing clinical signs of the disease.

It also hosts the virus Thurisazvirus myis.
