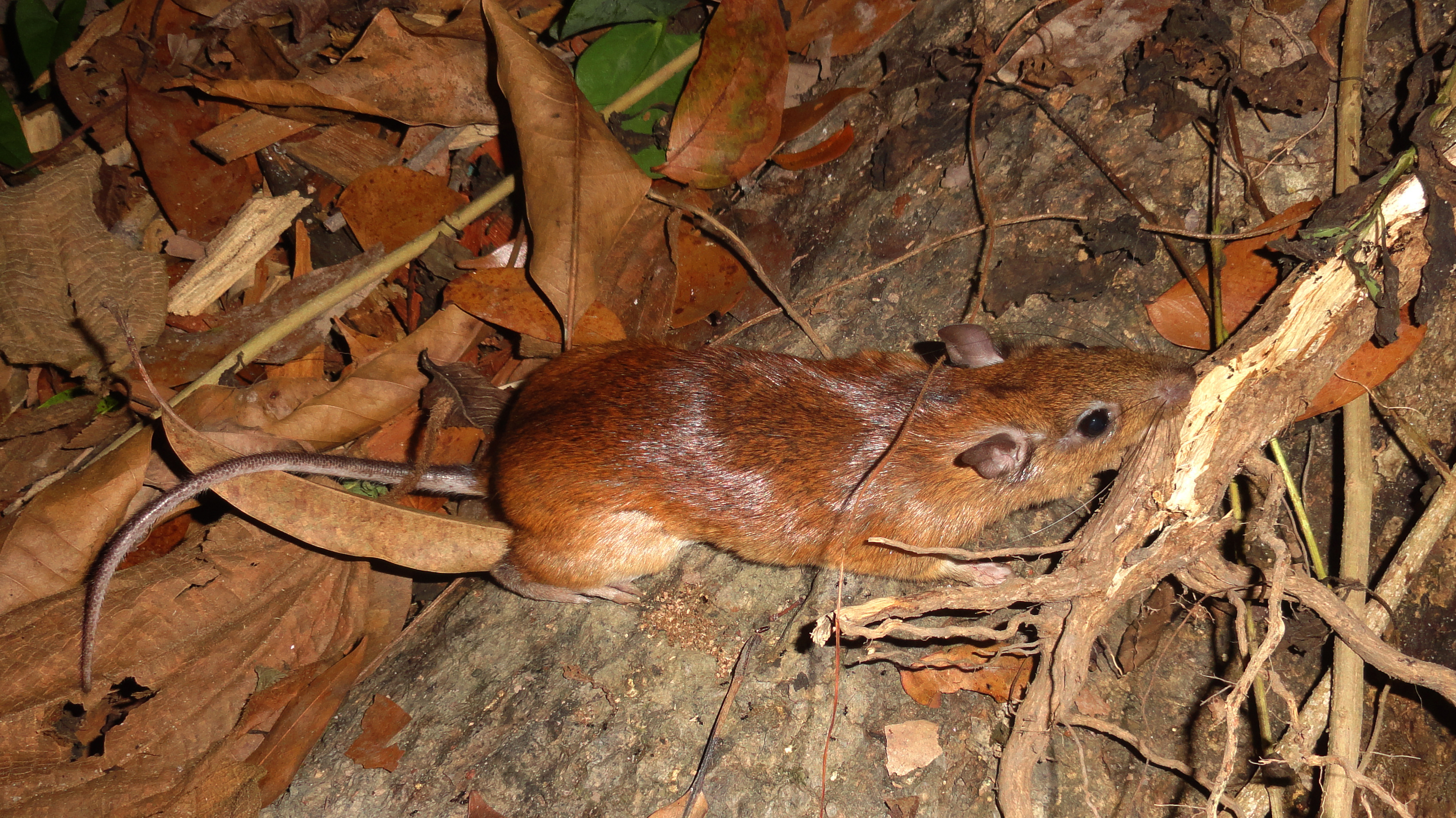
- Proechimys longicaudatus

Scientific classification
- Kingdom: Animalia
- Phylum: Chordata
- Class: Mammalia
- Order: Rodentia
- Family: Echimyidae
- Subfamily: Echimyinae
- Tribe: Myocastorini
- Genus: Proechimys; J. A. Allen, 1899

Type species
- Echimys trinitatis J. A. Allen & Chapman, 1893

Species
- Proechimys brevicauda Proechimys canicollis Proechimys chrysaeolus Proechimys cuvieri Proechimys decumanus Proechimys echinothrix Proechimys gardneri Proechimys goeldii Proechimys guairae Proechimys guyannensis Proechimys hoplomyoides Proechimys kulinae Proechimys longicaudatus Proechimys magdalenae Proechimys mincae Proechimys oconnelli Proechimys pattoni Proechimys poliopus Proechimys quadruplicatus Proechimys roberti Proechimys semispinosus Proechimys simonsi Proechimys steerei Proechimys trinitatis Proechimys urichi
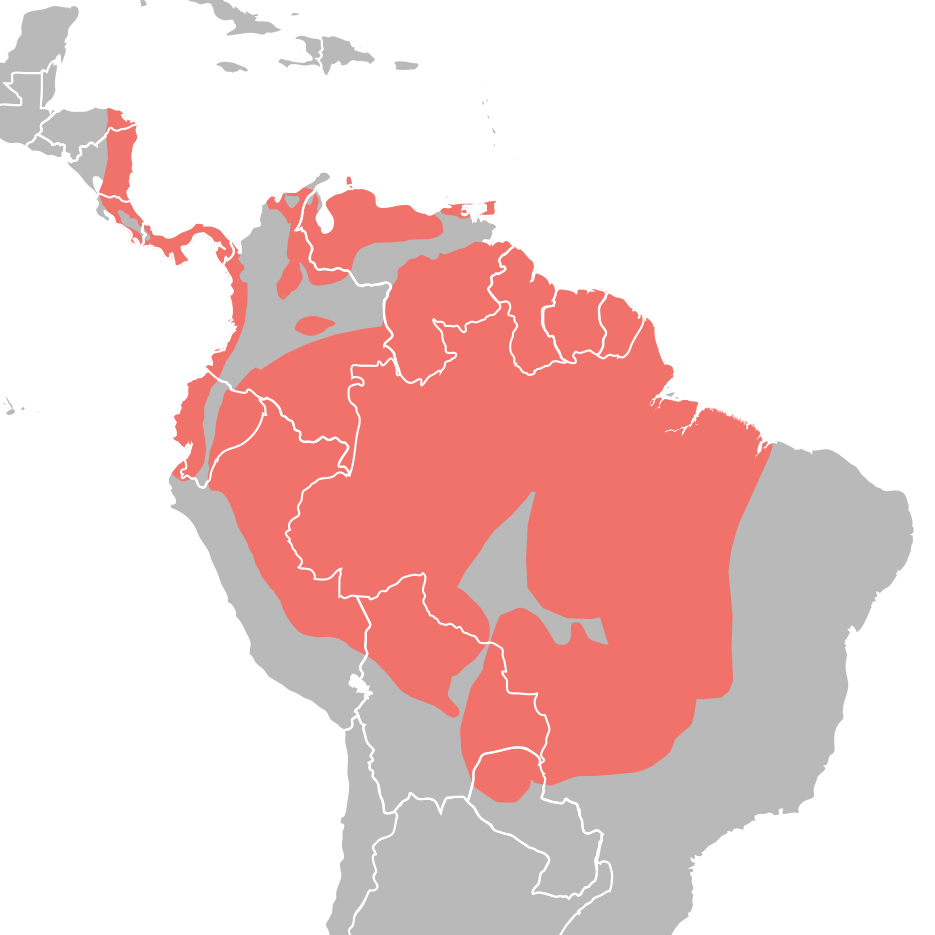
- Proechimys distribution

= Proechimys =

Genus of mammals belonging to the spiny rat family of rodents

Proechimys is a genus of South American spiny rats of the family Echimyidae. All species of the genus are terrestrial. In the lowland Neotropical forests, Proechimys rodents are often the most abundant non-volant mammals. They are recognizable by reason of their elongated heads and long rostra, large and erect ears, narrow and long hind feet, and tails always shorter than head-and-body lengths. The dorsal pelage comprises a mixture of expanded, varyingly stiffened spines (or aristiforms) — hence the vernacular name of spiny rats — and soft hairs (or setiforms).

Proechimys is the most speciose genus of the rodent family Echimyidae, with 25 species recognized, followed by Phyllomys with 13 species, and Trinomys with 11 species.

== Phylogeny ==
=== Genus level ===
The genus Proechimys is the sister group to the genus Hoplomys (the armored rat). In turn, these two taxa share evolutionary affinities with other Myocastorini genera: Callistomys (the painted tree-rat) and Myocastor (the coypu or nutria) on the one hand, and Thrichomys on the other hand.

Genus-level cladogram of the Myocastorini.

- Myocastorini
  - Thrichomys (punaré)
  - - Callistomys (painted tree-rat)
    - Myocastor (nutria)
  - - Hoplomys (armored rat)
    - Proechimys

The cladogram has been reconstructed from mitochondrial and nuclear DNA characters.

=== Species level ===
Reconstructing the systematics and phylogeny of Proechimys species have been greatly hampered by extreme levels of within- and among-population character variability. This difficulty has been emphasized by Pine et al.:

Among the rodents, Proechimys remains what may be the most problematical genus taxonomically in all mammaldom.

To infer the phylogeny of Proechimys at the species level, morphological characters and mitochondrial DNA sequences have been used, and allowed to group species into major clades but whose interrelationships remain unresolved. Six species groups were identified (group semispinosus, group longicaudatus, group guyannensis, group trinitatus, group goeldii, and group gardneri), and 4 species (Proechimys simonsi, P. echinothrix, P. canicollis, and P. decumanus) remained unaffiliated to any of these groups.

Species-level cladogram of the genus Proechimys.

- Myocastorini
  - Hoplomys
    Hoplomys gymnurus
  - Proechimys
    - Proechimys canicollis (Colombian spiny rat)
    - Proechimys decumanus (Pacific spiny rat)
    - Proechimys echinothrix (Stiff-spine spiny rat)
    - Proechimys simonsi (Simon's spiny rat)
    - group gardneri
      - Proechimys kulinae (Kulina spiny rat)
      - - Proechimys gardneri (Gardner's spiny rat)
        - Proechimys pattoni (Patton's spiny rat)
    - group semispinosus
      - Proechimys gorgonae
      - Proechimys oconnelli (O'Connell's spiny rat)
      - Proechimys semispinosus (Tome's spiny rat)
    - group guyannensis
      - Proechimys boimensis
      - Proechimys guyannensis (Guyenne spiny rat)
      - Proechimys oris
      - Proechimys roberti (Roberto's spiny rat)
    - group longicaudatus
      - Proechimys cuvieri (Cuvier's spiny rat)
      - - Proechimys brevicauda (Short-tailed spiny rat)
        - Proechimys gularis
        - Proechimys longicaudatus (Long-tailed spiny rat)
    - group goeldii
      - Proechimys amphichoricus
      - Proechimys goeldii (Goeldi's spiny rat)
      - Proechimys hyleae
      - Proechimys quadruplicatus (Napo spiny rat)
      - Proechimys steerei (Steere's spiny rat)
    - group trinitatus
      - Proechimys chrysaeolus (Boyacá spiny rat)
      - Proechimys guairae (Guaira spiny rat)
      - Proechimys hoplomyoides (Guyanan spiny rat)
      - Proechimys magdalenae (Magdalena spiny rat)
      - Proechimys mincae (Minca spiny rat)
      - Proechimys poliopus (Gray-footed spiny rat)
      - Proechimys trinitatus (Trinidad spiny rat)
      - Proechimys urichi (Sucre spiny rat)

The cladogram has been reconstructed from morphological characters and mitochondrial DNA (cytochrome b) sequences.

The different groups of species can be diagnosed as follows.

- Group semispinosus: it contains two species, Proechimys semispinosus, — with its widespread range, from Central America south from Honduras along the west coast of Colombia and Ecuador — and P. oconnelli, with a more limited range, east of the Cordillera Oriental in the north-western Amazon.
- Group longicaudatus: it contains the three species Proechimys longicaudatus, P. brevicauda, and P. cuvieri, united by lyrate and strongly fanged incisive foramina, and deep groves extending onto the anterior palate. They range from the lowland rainforest of the Guianan region and Amazon basin to dry forests of eastern Bolivia, northern Paraguay, and central Brazil.
- Group guyannensis: it contains the two species Proechimys guyannensis, and P. roberti, showing a plantar surface of hindfeet with six pads, and distributed mostly in the Guianan region, eastern Amazonia, and extending south into central Brazil.
- Group trinitatus: it contains the eight species Proechimys trinitatus, P. mincae, P. guairae, P. poliopus, P. magdalenae, P. chrysaeolus, P. urichi, and P. hoplomyoides. These taxa possess large and open incisive foramina, and simplified cheek teeth.
- Group goeldii: it contains the three species Proechimys steerei, P. quadruplicatus, and P. goeldii, united by a uniformly large body size. Members of this group most commonly inhabit the seasonally inundated várzea or igapó lowland forests of the Amazon basin.
- Group gardneri: it contains the three species Proechimys gardneri, P. pattoni, and P. kulinae, characterized by short head and body length — less than 185 millimetres (7.3 in). They are distributed in western Amazonia, but with non-overlapping ranges as all three species replace one another along the length of the Juruá River or on its opposite banks.

== Distribution ==
Proechimys species presently occur mainly in South America, in all countries except Argentina, Uruguay, and Chile. One member of the genus (P. semispinosus) also ranges into Central America.

Geographical distribution of Proechimys species in Brazil, Bolivia, Colombia, Ecuador, French Guiana, Guyana, Paraguay, Peru, Suriname, Trinidad and Tobago, Venezuela, and Central America (+ : presence in the corresponding country; — : not observed). Groups of species are numbered according to the species-level phylogeny.
Groups	Species	BRA	BOL	COL	ECU	GUF	GUY	PRY	PER	SUR	TTO	VEN	C.Am
03	Proechimys brevicauda	+	+	+	+	—	—	—	+	—	—	—	—
07	Proechimys canicollis	—	—	+	—	—	—	—	—	—	—	+	—
06	Proechimys chrysaeolus	—	—	+	—	—	—	—	—	—	—	—	—
03	Proechimys cuvieri	+	—	—	—	+	+	—	+	+	—	—	—
08	Proechimys decumanus	—	—	—	+	—	—	—	+	—	—	—	—
05	Proechimys echinothrix	+	—	?	—	—	—	—	—	—	—	—	—
10	Proechimys gardneri	+	+	—	—	—	—	—	—	—	—	—	—
09	Proechimys goeldii	+	—	—	—	—	—	—	—	—	—	—	—
06	Proechimys guairae	—	—	—	—	—	—	—	—	—	—	+	—
04	Proechimys guyannensis	+	—	—	—	+	+	—	—	+	—	+	—
06	Proechimys hoplomyoides	+	—	—	—	—	+	—	—	—	—	+	—
10	Proechimys kulinae	+	—	—	—	—	—	—	+	—	—	—	—
03	Proechimys longicaudatus	+	+	—	—	—	—	+	—	—	—	—	—
06	Proechimys magdalenae	—	—	+	—	—	—	—	—	—	—	—	—
06	Proechimys mincae	—	—	+	—	—	—	—	—	—	—	—	—
02	Proechimys oconnelli	—	—	+	—	—	—	—	—	—	—	—	—
10	Proechimys pattoni	+	—	—	—	—	—	—	+	—	—	—	—
06	Proechimys poliopus	—	—	+	—	—	—	—	—	—	—	+	—
09	Proechimys quadruplicatus	+	—	+	+	—	—	—	+	—	—	+	—
04	Proechimys roberti	+	—	—	—	—	—	—	—	—	—	—	—
02	Proechimys semispinosus	—	—	+	+	—	—	—	—	—	—	—	+
01	Proechimys simonsi	+	+	+	+	—	—	—	+	—	—	—	—
09	Proechimys steerei	+	+	—	—	—	—	—	+	—	—	—	—
06	Proechimys trinitatus	—	—	—	—	—	—	—	—	—	+	—	—
06	Proechimys urichi	—	—	—	—	—	—	—	—	—	—	+	—
