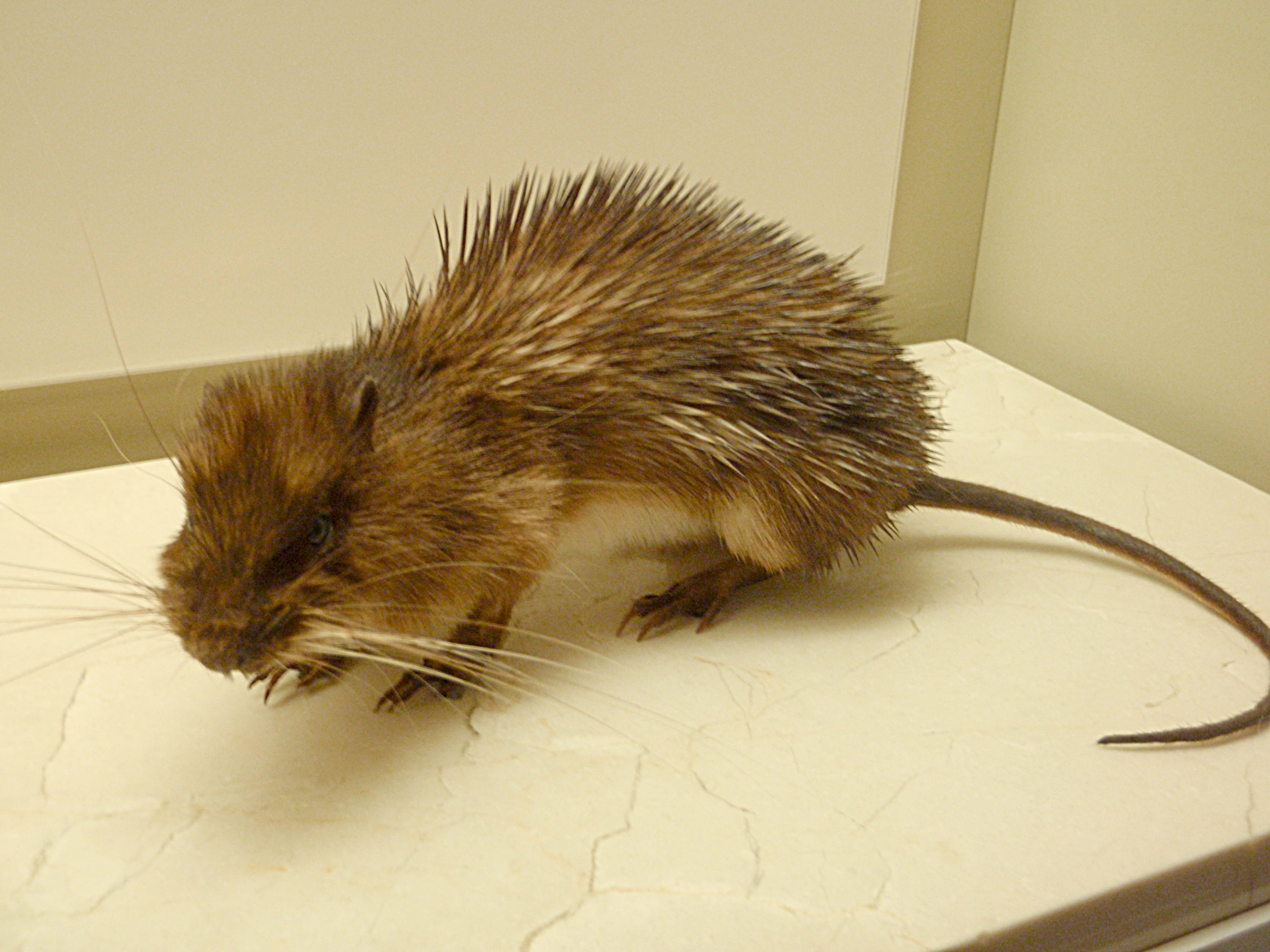

Conservation status
- Least Concern (IUCN 3.1)

Scientific classification
- Kingdom: Animalia
- Phylum: Chordata
- Class: Mammalia
- Infraclass: Placentalia
- Order: Rodentia
- Family: Echimyidae
- Subfamily: Echimyinae
- Tribe: Myocastorini
- Genus: Hoplomys; J. A. Allen, 1908
- Species: H. gymnurus

Binomial name
- Hoplomys gymnurus (Thomas, 1897)
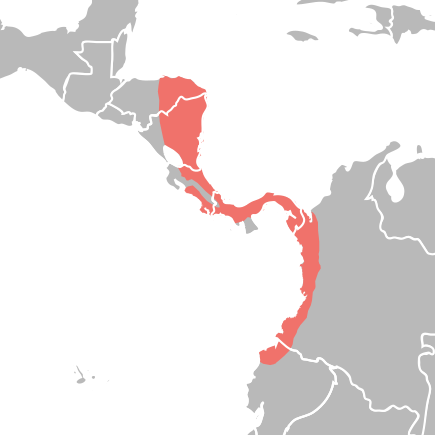
- Distribution of the armored rat

= Armored rat =

Species of mammals belonging to the spiny rat family of rodents

The armored rat (Hoplomys gymnurus) is a species of rodent in the family Echimyidae. It is monotypic within the genus Hoplomys. It is found in Latin America, from northern Honduras to northwest Ecuador. It possesses a range of spines on its back and sides of the body.

== Description ==
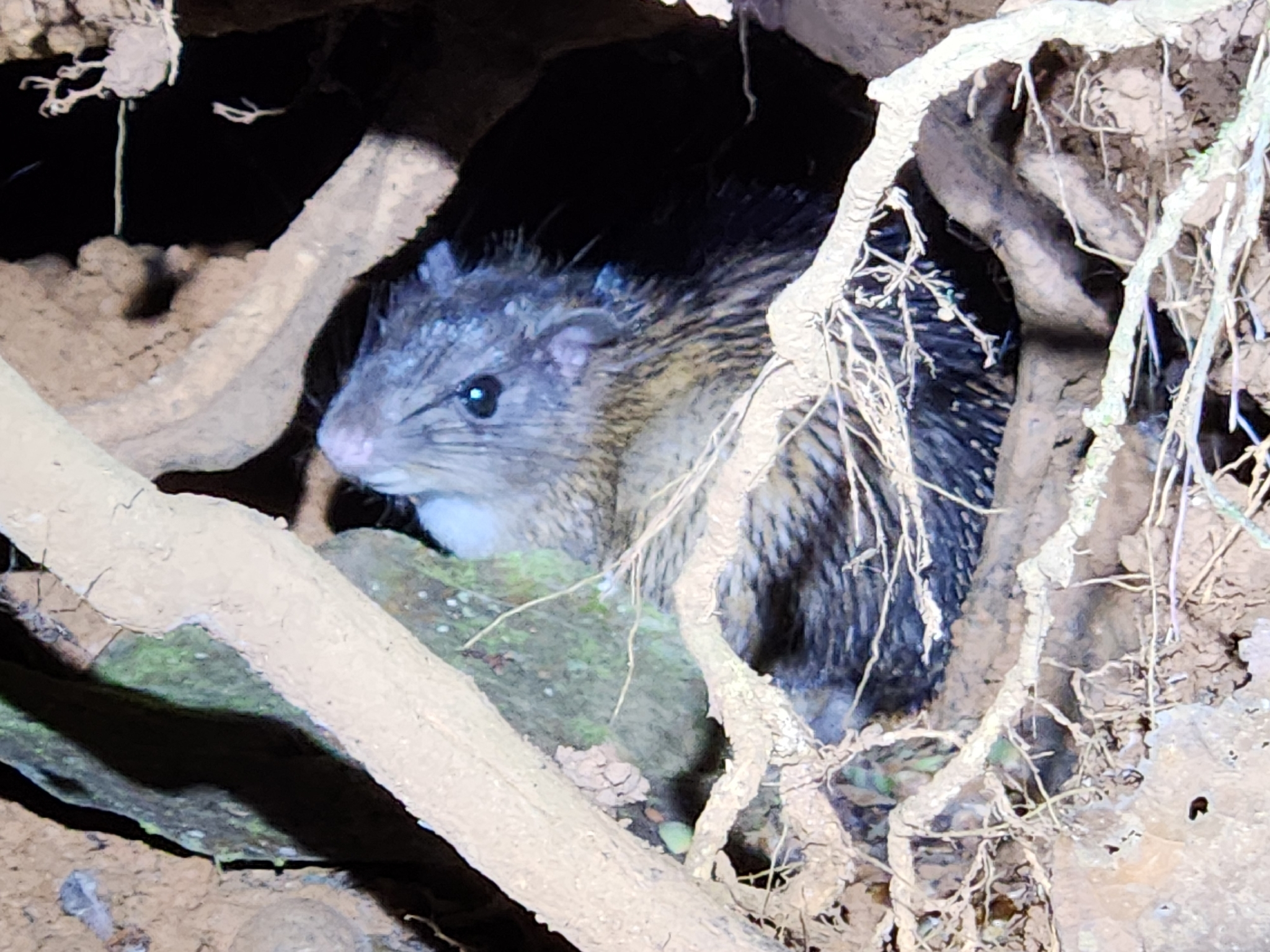
An armored rat in Gamboa, Panama

Adults weigh between 218–790 grams (0.481–1.742 lb) with males weighing more on average than females. They are born with soft fur, and the spines begin growing after the first month. The thick spines on the back and sides measure up to 33 millimetres (1.3 in) and 2 millimetres (0.079 in) in diameter. The head and body measures between 220–320 millimetres (8.7–12.6 in) in length, with the tail adding another 150–255 millimetres (5.9–10.0 in). The color of the armored rat range from black to reddish brown, and has a pure white underside. They are similar in appearance to Tome's spiny-rat, but the eyes of the armored rat are smaller and they have a longer snout. Its diet includes fruit, insects and green plant matter. The normal litter size is one to three.

== Habitat ==
The armored rat is a terrestrial species, which occupies burrows. These burrows are usually positioned in steep banks close to a water source, and can measure up to 2 metres (6.6 ft) in length before reaching an enlarged nesting chamber. The armored rat covers its nesting chamber with vegetation and keeps it dry. It uses a separate chamber for defecating.

This species is distributed from northern Honduras to northwest Ecuador, from lowlands up to around 800 metres (2,600 ft) in altitude, including Panama's isolated Caribbean island of Isla Escudo de Veraguas.

== Behaviour ==
The armored rat is nocturnal, spending most of its day inside its burrow and coming out at night to forage for food. It primarily eats fruits like bananas, wild figs, avocados, and mangoes, but it will also hunt insects like beetles and grasshoppers. It exhibits caching behaviour, bringing back some food to its burrow.

The armored rat is considered a seed disperser for the palm Attalea butyraceae, as well as an ecosystem engineer, with its many pathways and burrows creating microhabitats for smaller organisms and nests for other animals—with one armored rat burrow found to contain an extra cavity full of iguanid lizard eggs.

While some armoured rats breed year-round, others will time their breeding to coincide with the rain. Pregnant females have been found from February to July. After 64 days of gestation, they give birth to a litter of one to three precocial pups (born without spiny fur). The young are sheltered in their mother's burrow and fed for some three to four weeks. By the time they're weaned off her milk, their fur has already begun to develop into spines. Armored rats mature at around 5 months of age.

== Etymology ==
- The genus name Hoplomys derives from the two Ancient Greek words ὅπλον (hóplon), meaning "armor", and μῦς (mûs), meaning "rat".
- The species name gymnurus derives from the two Ancient Greek words γυμνός (gumnós), meaning "naked", and οὐρά (ourá), meaning "tail".

== Phylogeny ==
Part of the infraorder Hystricognathi and family Echimyidae, armored rats are more closely related to porcupines, Guinea pigs, chinchillas, and common degus than to the common brown rat.

Within Echimyidae, the genus Hoplomys is the sister group to the genus Proechimys. In turn, these two taxa share evolutionary affinities with other Myocastorini genera: Callistomys (painted tree-rats) and Myocastor (coypus or nutrias) on the one hand, and Thrichomys on the other hand.

Genus-level cladogram of the Myocastorini.

- Myocastorini
  - Thrichomys (punaré)
  - - Callistomys (painted tree-rat)
    - Myocastor (nutria)
  - - Hoplomys (armored rat)
    - Proechimys

The cladogram has been reconstructed from mitochondrial and nuclear DNA characters.
