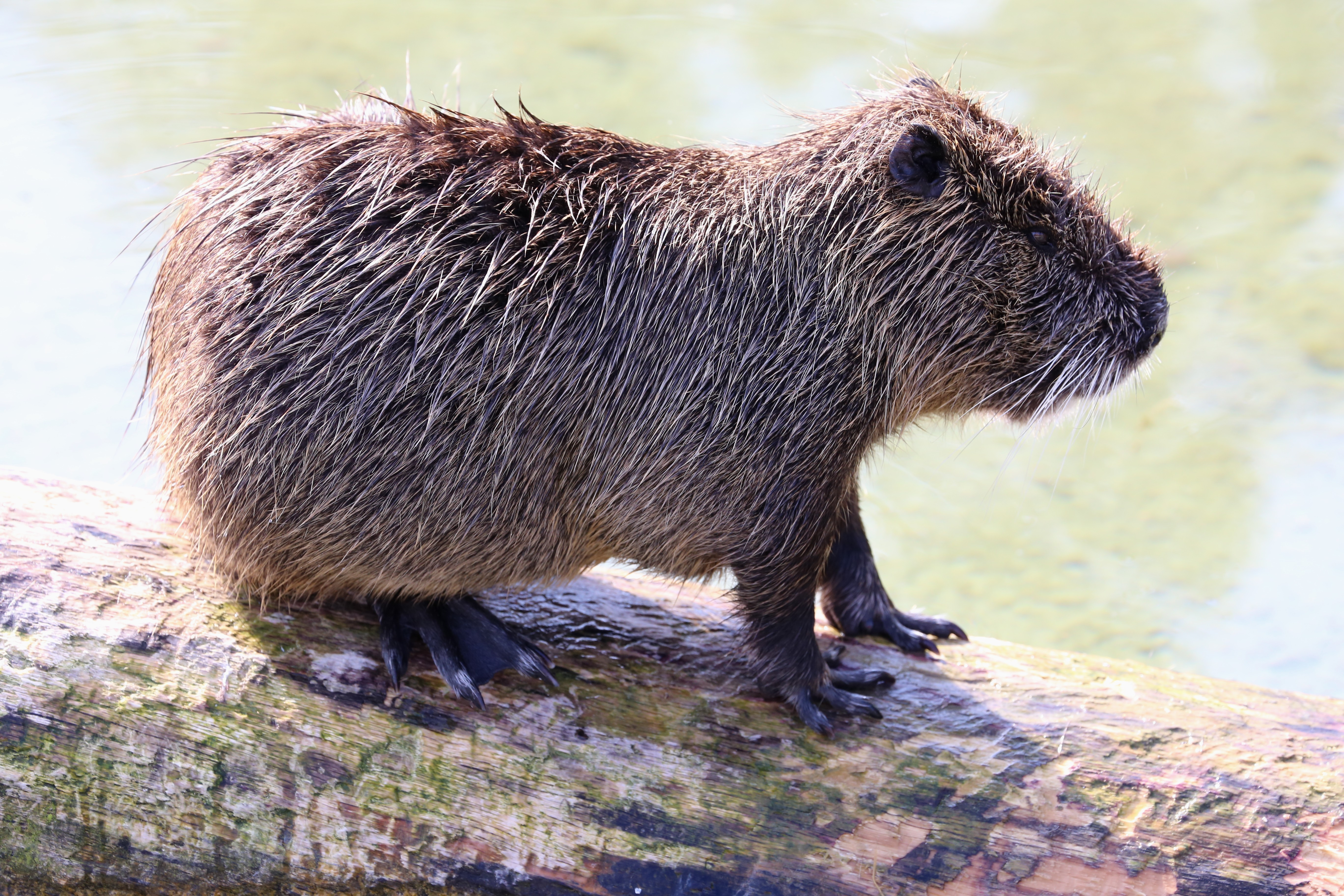
- Nutria (Myocastor coypus)

Scientific classification
- Kingdom: Animalia
- Phylum: Chordata
- Class: Mammalia
- Order: Rodentia
- Family: Echimyidae
- Subfamily: Echimyinae
- Tribe: Myocastorini; Ameghino, 1904

Genera
- Callistomys; Hoplomys; Myocastor; Proechimys; Thrichomys

= Myocastorini =

Tribe of rodents

Myocastorini is a tribe of echimyid rodents, proposed in 2017, and containing the five extant genera Callistomys, Hoplomys, Myocastor, Proechimys, and Thrichomys.

== Definition ==
Myocastorini members share long upper incisor roots (except Callistomys), and mid- to long-sized lower incisor roots. These five genera share either four (Callistomys, Thrichomys) or five (Hoplomys, Myocastor, Proechimys) lophids on the lower deciduous fourth premolar, three roots anchoring the upper molars, and well-connected lophs on cheek teeth.

Members display a variety of lifestyles including terrestrial (Hoplomys, Proechimys, Thrichomys), arboreal (Callistomys), and amphibious (Myocastor) adaptations.

== Phylogeny ==
On the one hand, the genus Proechimys is the sister group to the genus Hoplomys (armored rats), and both form a clade of lowland rainforest terrestrial spiny rats. On the other hand, Callistomys (painted tree-rats) is the sister group to Myocastor (coypus). In turn, these two pairs of genera share evolutionary affinities with Thrichomys (punaré).

Genus-level cladogram of the Myocastorini.

- Myocastorini
  - Thrichomys (punaré)
  - - Callistomys (painted tree-rat)
    - Myocastor (nutria)
  - - Hoplomys (armored rat)
    - Proechimys

The cladogram has been reconstructed from mitochondrial and nuclear DNA characters.
