= List of echimyids =

Species in mammal family Echimyidae

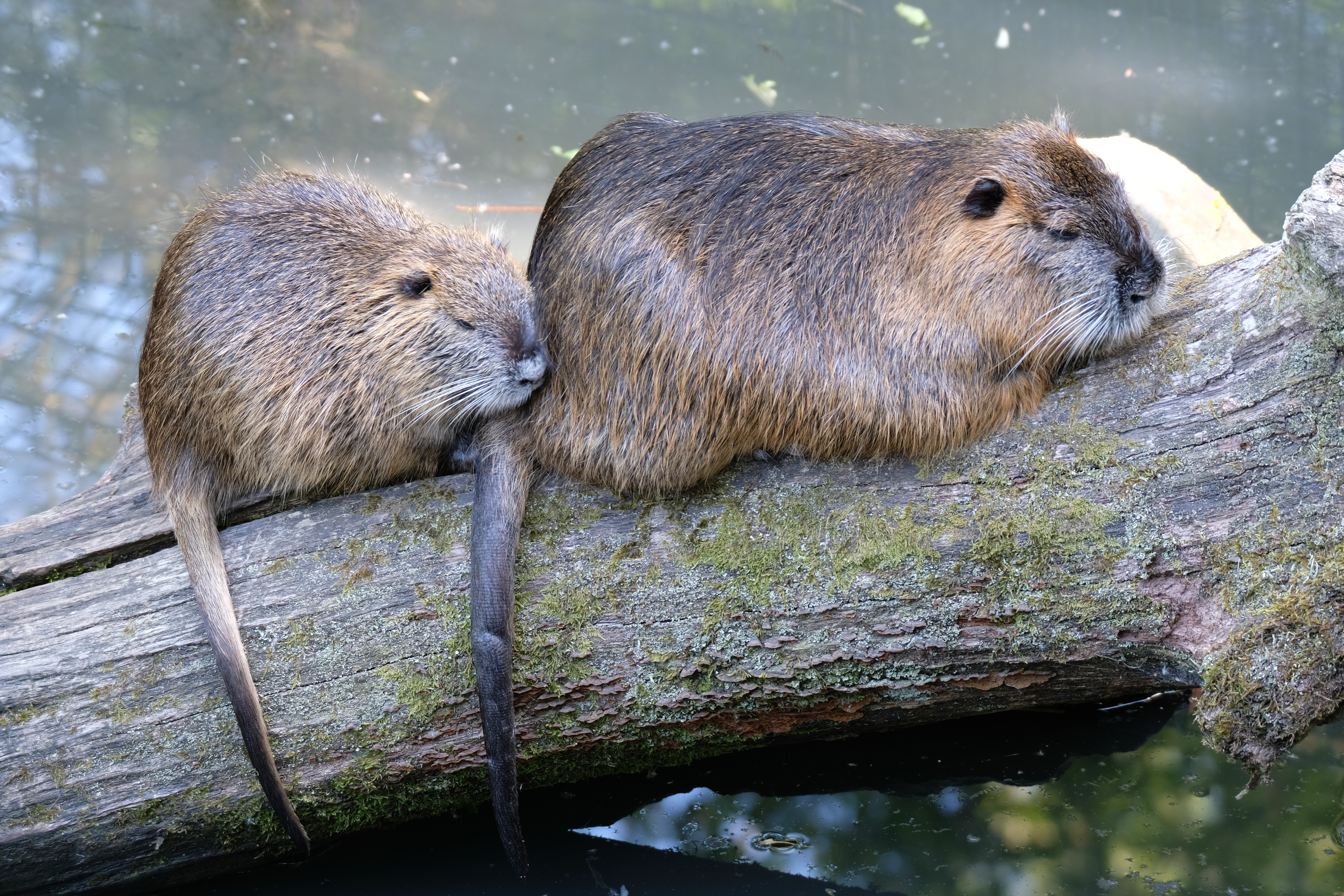
Nutrias (Myocastor coypus)

Echimyidae is a family of mammals in the order Rodentia and part of the Caviomorpha parvorder. Members of this family are called echimyids or Neotropical spiny rats, and include spiny rats, tree-rats, and cave rats. They are found in South America and Central America, though the nutria has been introduced to the United States, Europe, and Japan. They live primarily in forests, savannas, and grasslands, though some species can be found in shrublands, wetlands, and rocky areas. They range in size from the Sao Lourenço punaré, at 12 cm (5 in) plus a 13 cm (5 in) tail, to the nutria, at 57 cm (22 in) plus a 40 cm (16 in) tail. Echimyids primarily eat a wide variety of vegetation, though some species also eat insects. Almost no echimyids have population estimates, but six species—the painted tree-rat, giant Atlantic tree-rat, Lund's Atlantic tree-rat, orange-brown Atlantic tree-rat, Moojen's Atlantic spiny rat, and Yonenaga's Atlantic spiny rat—are categorized as an endangered species, and three—the Mantiqueira Atlantic tree-rat, short-furred Atlantic tree-rat, and red-crested tree-rat—are categorized as critically endangered, while six species of Caribbean cave rat, comprising the three genera of the subfamily Heteropsomyinae, were driven to extinction since 1500 due to the European colonization of the Americas and introduction of non-native rats, with some species surviving until the 1900s.

The 88 extant species of Echimyidae are divided into three subfamilies: Caterodontinae, containing a single species; Echimyinae, containing 75 species in 18 genera, and Euryzygomatomyinae, containing 12 species in 3 genera. The family Capromyidae, or the hutias, has been proposed to be merged into Echimyidae as the subfamily Capromyinae, but the proposal is not yet universally accepted. A few extinct prehistoric echimyid species have been discovered, though due to ongoing research and discoveries, the exact number and categorization is not fixed.

== Conventions ==
IUCN Red List categories
Conservation status
- EX: Extinct (6 species)
- EW: Extinct in the wild (0 species)
- CR: Critically endangered (3 species)
- EN: Endangered (6 species)
- VU: Vulnerable (0 species)
- NT: Near threatened (2 species)
- LC: Least concern (48 species)

Other categories
- DD: Data deficient (29 species)
- NE: Not evaluated (0 species)

The author citation for the species or genus is given after the scientific name; parentheses around the author citation indicate that this was not the original taxonomic placement. Conservation status codes listed follow the International Union for Conservation of Nature (IUCN) Red List of Threatened Species. Range maps are provided wherever possible; if a range map is not available, a description of the echimyid's range is provided. Ranges are based on the IUCN Red List for that species unless otherwise noted. All extinct species, subspecies, or genera listed alongside extant species went extinct after 1500 CE, and are indicated by a dagger symbol: "†".

== Classification ==
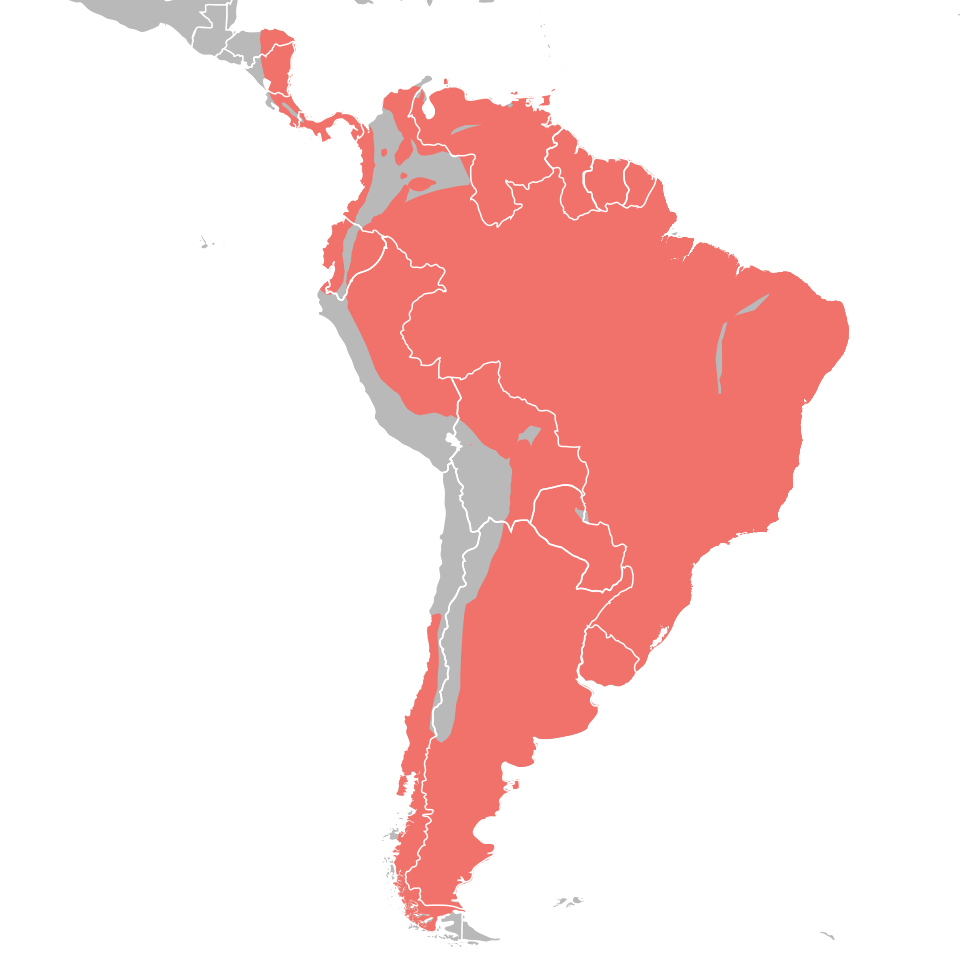
Echimyidae distribution

Echimyidae is a family consisting of 88 extant species in 22 genera. These species are divided into three subfamilies: Caterodontinae, containing a single species; Echimyinae, containing 75 species in 18 genera, and Euryzygomatomyinae, containing 12 species in 3 genera. Additionally, the subfamily Heteropsomyinae, containing 6 species in 3 genera, was driven extinct during the modern era due to the European colonization of the Americas, with some species surviving until the 1900s.

- Family Echimyidae
  - Subfamily Caterodontinae
    - Genus Carterodon (Owl's spiny rat): one species
  - Subfamily Echimyinae
    - Genus Callistomys (painted tree-rat): one species
    - Genus Dactylomys (bamboo rats): three species
    - Genus Diplomys (soft-furred spiny rats): two species
    - Genus Echimys (spiny tree-rats): three species
    - Genus Hoplomys (armored rat): one species
    - Genus Isothrix (brush-tailed rats): six species
    - Genus Kannabateomys (Atlantic bamboo rat): one species
    - Genus Lonchothrix (tuft-tailed spiny tree-rat): one species
    - Genus Makalata (armored tree-rats): three species
    - Genus Mesomys (spiny tree-rats): four species
    - Genus Myocastor (nutria): one species
    - Genus Olallamys (olalla rats): two species
    - Genus Pattonomys (speckled tree-rats): five species
    - Genus Phyllomys (Atlantic tree-rats): thirteen species
    - Genus Proechimys (spiny rats): twenty-two species
    - Genus Santamartamys (red-crested tree-rat): one species
    - Genus Thrichomys (punarés): four species
    - Genus Toromys (giant tree-rats): two species
  - Subfamily Euryzygomatomyinae
    - Genus Clyomys (broad-headed spiny rat): one species
    - Genus Euryzygomatomys (Fischer's guiara): one species
    - Genus Trinomys (Atlantic spiny rats): ten species
  - Subfamily Heteropsomyinae †
    - Genus Boromys † (Cuban cave rats): two species
    - Genus Brotomys † (edible rats): two species
    - Genus Heteropsomys † (Puerto Rican cave rats): two species

- Echimyidae
  - - - Caterodontinae
        Carterodon
      - Euryzygomatomyinae
        - Trinomys
        - - Clyomys
          - Euryzygomatomys
  - - Echimyinae
      - - Thrichomys
        - - Myocastor
          - - Callistomys
            - - Hoplomys
              - Proechimys
      - - - Isothrix
          - - Lonchothrix
            - Mesomys
        - - - - Diplomys
              - Santamartamys
            - - Olallamys
              - - Dactylomys
                - Kannabateomys
          - - - Pattonomys
              - Toromys
            - - Makalata
              - - Echimys
                - Phyllomys

== Echimyids ==
The following classification is based on the taxonomy described by the reference work Mammal Species of the World (2005), with augmentation by generally accepted proposals made since using molecular phylogenetic analysis, as supported by both the IUCN and the American Society of Mammalogists.

=== Subfamily Carterodontinae ===
Genus Carterodon – Waterhouse, 1848 – one species
Common name	Scientific name and subspecies	Range	Size and ecology	IUCN status and estimated population
Owl's spiny rat	C. sulcidens (Lund, 1841)	Southeastern Brazil	Size: 13–25 cm (5–10 in) long, plus 6–10 cm (2–4 in) tail Habitat: Forest and savanna Diet: Vegetation	DD Unknown

=== Subfamily Echimyinae ===
Genus Callistomys – Emmons & Vucetich, 1998 – one species
Common name	Scientific name and subspecies	Range	Size and ecology	IUCN status and estimated population
Painted tree-rat	C. pictus (Pictet, 1841)	Eastern Brazil	Size: 25–29 cm (10–11 in) long, plus 27–32 cm (11–13 in) tail Habitat: Forest Diet: Vegetation	EN Unknown

Genus Dactylomys – Geoffroy, 1838 – three species
Common name	Scientific name and subspecies	Range	Size and ecology	IUCN status and estimated population
Amazon bamboo rat	D. dactylinus (Desmarest, 1817) Three subspecies: D. d. canescens; D. d. dactylinus; D. d. modestus	Northern South America	Size: About 31 cm (12 in) long, plus about 39 cm (15 in) tail Habitat: Forest Diet: Bamboo and other plants	LC Unknown
Bolivian bamboo rat	D. boliviensis Anthony, 1920	Western South America	Size: 27–29 cm (11 in) long, plus about 41 cm (16 in) tail Habitat: Forest Diet: Bamboo and other plants	LC Unknown
Montane bamboo rat	D. peruanus Allen, 1900	Bolivia and Peru	Size: About 24 cm (9 in) long, plus 32 cm (13 in) tail Habitat: Forest Diet: Bamboo and other plants	DD Unknown

Genus Diplomys – Thomas, 1916 – two species
Common name	Scientific name and subspecies	Range	Size and ecology	IUCN status and estimated population
Colombian soft-furred spiny rat	D. caniceps (Günther, 1877)	Northern Colombia (in green)	Size: 21–39 cm (8–15 in) long, plus 17–27 cm (7–11 in) tail Habitat: Forest Diet: Seeds and fruit	DD Unknown
Rufous soft-furred spiny rat	D. labilis (Bangs, 1901)	Northwestern South America and Panama (in red)	Size: About 34 cm (13 in) long, plus 20 cm (8 in) tail Habitat: Forest Diet: Seeds and fruit	LC Unknown

Genus Echimys – F. Cuvier, 1809 – three species
Common name	Scientific name and subspecies	Range	Size and ecology	IUCN status and estimated population
Dark spiny tree-rat	E. saturnus Thomas, 1928	Ecuador and Peru (in green)	Size: 28–33 cm (11–13 in) long, plus 29–38 cm (11–15 in) tail Habitat: Forest Diet: Vegetation	DD Unknown
Vieira's tree-rat	E. vieirai Iack-Ximenes, Vivo, & Percequillo, 2005	Northern Brazil (in blue)	Size: About 24 cm (9 in) long, plus about 34 cm (13 in) tail Habitat: Forest Diet: Vegetation	DD Unknown
White-faced spiny tree-rat	E. chrysurus (Zimmermann, 1780)	Northern South America	Size: 24–33 cm (9–13 in) long, plus 25–39 cm (10–15 in) tail Habitat: Forest Diet: Vegetation	LC Unknown

Genus Hoplomys – J. A. Allen, 1908 – one species
Common name	Scientific name and subspecies	Range	Size and ecology	IUCN status and estimated population
Armored rat	H. gymnurus (Thomas, 1897)	Central America and northwestern South America	Size: 21–32 cm (8–13 in) long, plus 11–24 cm (4–9 in) tail Habitat: Forest Diet: Wide variety of vegetation, as well as insects	LC Unknown

Genus Isothrix – Wagner, 1845 – six species
Common name	Scientific name and subspecies	Range	Size and ecology	IUCN status and estimated population
Barbara Brown's brush-tailed rat	I. barbarabrownae Patterson & Velazco, 2006	Southern Peru (in brown, in box)	Size: Unknown Habitat: Forest Diet: Vegetation	DD Unknown
Orinoco brush-tailed rat	I. orinoci Thomas, 1899	Northern South America (in blue)	Size: 21–26 cm (8–10 in) long, plus 16–28 cm (6–11 in) tail Habitat: Forest Diet: Vegetation	DD Unknown
Plain brush-tailed rat	I. pagurus Wagner, 1845	Northern Brazil (in green)	Size: 17–23 cm (7–9 in) long, plus 17–23 cm (7–9 in) tail Habitat: Forest Diet: Vegetation	LC Unknown
Rio Negro brush-tailed rat	I. negrensis Thomas, 1920	Northwestern Brazil (in orange)	Size: 20–29 cm (8–11 in) long, plus 18–27 cm (7–11 in) tail Habitat: Forest Diet: Vegetation	LC Unknown
Sinnamary brush-tailed rat	I. sinnamariensis Vié, Volobouev, Patton, & Granjon, 1996	Northern South America (in purple)	Size: About 21 cm (8 in) long, plus about 26 cm (10 in) tail Habitat: Forest Diet: Vegetation	LC Unknown
Yellow-crowned brush-tailed rat	I. bistriata Wagner, 1845	Western South America (in red)	Size: 21–27 cm (8–11 in) long, plus 21–27 cm (8–11 in) tail Habitat: Forest and grassland Diet: Vegetation	LC Unknown

Genus Kannabateomys – Jentink, 1891 – one species
Common name	Scientific name and subspecies	Range	Size and ecology	IUCN status and estimated population
Atlantic bamboo rat	K. amblyonyx Wagner, 1845 Two subspecies: K. a. amblyonyx; K. a. pallidior	Eastern South America	Size: 23–35 cm (9–14 in) long, plus 30–42 cm (12–17 in) tail Habitat: Forest Diet: Bamboo	LC Unknown

Genus Lonchothrix – Thomas, 1920 – one species
Common name	Scientific name and subspecies	Range	Size and ecology	IUCN status and estimated population
Tuft-tailed spiny tree-rat	L. emiliae Thomas, 1920	Northern Brazil	Size: 15–22 cm (6–9 in) long, plus 15–23 cm (6–9 in) tail Habitat: Forest and grassland Diet: Vegetation	LC Unknown

Genus Makalata – Husson, 1978 – three species
Common name	Scientific name and subspecies	Range	Size and ecology	IUCN status and estimated population
Brazilian spiny tree-rat	M. didelphoides (Desmarest, 1817)	Northern South America (in red)	Size: 15–25 cm (6–10 in) long, plus 15–23 cm (6–9 in) tail Habitat: Forest Diet: Fruit and seeds	LC Unknown
Dusky spiny tree-rat	M. obscura (Wagner, 1840)	Brazil	Size: Unknown Habitat: Unknown Diet: Fruit and seeds	DD Unknown
Long-tailed armored tree-rat	M. macrura (Wagner, 1842)	Northwestern South America (in blue)	Size: 21–28 cm (8–11 in) long, plus 17–24 cm (7–9 in) tail Habitat: Forest Diet: Fruit and seeds	LC Unknown

Genus Mesomys – Wagner, 1845 – four species
Common name	Scientific name and subspecies	Range	Size and ecology	IUCN status and estimated population
Ferreira's spiny tree-rat	M. hispidus (Desmarest, 1817)	Northern South America (in red)	Size: 17–19 cm (7 in) long, plus 16–20 cm (6–8 in) tail Habitat: Forest Diet: Vegetation	LC Unknown
Pará spiny tree-rat	M. stimulax Thomas, 1911	Northern Brazil (in blue)	Size: 15–20 cm (6–8 in) long, plus 12–20 cm (5–8 in) tail Habitat: Forest Diet: Vegetation	LC Unknown
Tufted-tailed spiny tree-rat	M. occultus Patton, Silva, & Malcolm, 2000	Northwestern Brazil (in green)	Size: About 17 cm (7 in) long, plus about 18 cm (7 in) tail Habitat: Forest Diet: Vegetation	LC Unknown
Woolly-headed spiny tree-rat	M. leniceps Thomas & St. Leger, 1926	Western Peru (in yellow, in box)	Size: About 18 cm (7 in) long, plus about 21 cm (8 in) tail Habitat: Forest Diet: Vegetation	DD Unknown

Genus Myocastor – Kerr, 1792 – one species
Common name	Scientific name and subspecies	Range	Size and ecology	IUCN status and estimated population
Nutria	M. coypus (Molina, 1782)	Southern South America, and introduced in United States, Europe, and Japan	Size: 47–57 cm (19–22 in) long, plus 34–40 cm (13–16 in) tail Habitat: Inland wetlands Diet: Roots and aquatic plants	LC Unknown

Genus Olallamys – Emmons, 1988 – two species
Common name	Scientific name and subspecies	Range	Size and ecology	IUCN status and estimated population
Greedy olalla rat	O. edax (Thomas, 1916)	Western Venezuela (in green)	Size: About 22 cm (9 in) long, plus about 34 cm (13 in) tail Habitat: Forest and shrubland Diet: Vegetation	DD Unknown
White-tailed olalla rat	O. albicauda (Günther, 1879)	Colombia (in red)	Size: 15–18 cm (6–7 in) long, plus 25–26 cm (10 in) tail Habitat: Forest Diet: Vegetation	DD Unknown

Genus Pattonomys – Emmons, 2005 – five species
Common name	Scientific name and subspecies	Range	Size and ecology	IUCN status and estimated population
Bare-tailed armored tree-rat	P. occasius (Thomas, 1921)	Ecuador (in green)	Size: About 22 cm (9 in) long, plus about 22 cm (9 in) tail Habitat: Forest Diet: Vegetation	DD Unknown
Carriker's speckled tree-rat	P. carrikeri (J. A. Allen, 1911)	Northern Venezuela (in red)	Size: About 22 cm (9 in) long, plus about 22 cm (9 in) tail Habitat: Forest and savanna Diet: Vegetation	DD Unknown
Orinocoan speckled tree-rat	P. punctatus Thomas, 1899	Venezuela	Size: About 27 cm (11 in) long, plus about 23 cm (9 in) tail Habitat: Forest Diet: Vegetation	DD Unknown
Speckled spiny tree-rat	P. semivillosus (Geoffroy, 1838)	Colombia (in blue)	Size: 20–27 cm (8–11 in) long, plus 21–26 cm (8–10 in) tail Habitat: Forest and savanna Diet: Vegetation	LC Unknown
Yellow speckled tree-rat	P. flavidus Hollister, 1914	Northern Venezuela (in purple)	Size: About 25 cm (10 in) long, plus about 25 cm (10 in) tail Habitat: Unknown Diet: Vegetation	DD Unknown

Genus Phyllomys – Lund, 1839 – thirteen species
Common name	Scientific name and subspecies	Range	Size and ecology	IUCN status and estimated population
Black-spined Atlantic tree-rat	P. nigrispinus (Wagner, 1842)	Southern Brazil	Size: 19–26 cm (7–10 in) long, plus 19–26 cm (7–10 in) tail Habitat: Forest Diet: Vegetation	LC Unknown
Drab Atlantic tree-rat	P. dasythrix Hensel, 1872	Southern Brazil	Size: 18–20 cm (7–8 in) long, plus 20–22 cm (8–9 in) tail Habitat: Forest Diet: Vegetation	LC Unknown
Giant Atlantic tree-rat	P. thomasi (H. von Ihering, 1897)	Southern Brazil	Size: 27–30 cm (11–12 in) long, plus 27–34 cm (11–13 in) tail Habitat: Forest Diet: Vegetation	EN Unknown
Golden Atlantic tree-rat	P. blainvillii (Jourdan, 1837)	Eastern Brazil	Size: 17–22 cm (7–9 in) long, plus 19–27 cm (7–11 in) tail Habitat: Forest Diet: Vegetation	LC Unknown
Kerr's Atlantic tree-rat	P. kerri (Oliveira, 1950)	Southern Brazil	Size: 19–23 cm (7–9 in) long, plus 20–22 cm (8–9 in) tail Habitat: Forest Diet: Vegetation	DD Unknown
Long-furred Atlantic tree-rat	P. medius (Thomas, 1909)	Southern Brazil	Size: 22–23 cm (9 in) long, plus 22–26 cm (9–10 in) tail Habitat: Forest Diet: Vegetation	LC Unknown
Lund's Atlantic tree-rat	P. lundi Leite, 2003	Southern Brazil	Size: 18–21 cm (7–8 in) long, plus about 20 cm (8 in) tail Habitat: Forest Diet: Vegetation	EN Unknown
Mantiqueira Atlantic tree-rat	P. mantiqueirensis Leite, 2003	Southern Brazil	Size: About 22 cm (9 in) long, plus about 22 cm (9 in) tail Habitat: Forest Diet: Vegetation	CR Unknown
Orange-brown Atlantic tree-rat	P. brasiliensis Lund, 1840	Southern Brazil	Size: About 21 cm (8 in) long, plus about 17 cm (7 in) tail Habitat: Unknown Diet: Vegetation	EN Unknown
Pallid Atlantic tree-rat	P. lamarum (Thomas, 1916)	Eastern Brazil	Size: 18–23 cm (7–9 in) long, plus 18–23 cm (7–9 in) tail Habitat: Forest Diet: Vegetation	DD Unknown
Rusty-sided Atlantic tree-rat	P. pattoni Emmons, Leite, Kock, Costa, 2002	Eastern Brazil	Size: 21–24 cm (8–9 in) long, plus 19–22 cm (7–9 in) tail Habitat: Forest Diet: Vegetation	LC Unknown
Short-furred Atlantic tree-rat	P. unicolor (Wagner, 1842)	Eastern Brazil	Size: About 28 cm (11 in) long, plus about 20 cm (8 in) tail Habitat: Forest Diet: Vegetation	CR Unknown
Southern Atlantic tree-rat	P. sulinus Leite, Christoff, & Fagundes, 2008	Southern Brazil	Size: 20–21 cm (8 in) long, plus 16–25 cm (6–10 in) tail Habitat: Forest Diet: Vegetation	DD Unknown

Genus Proechimys – Allen, 1899 – 22 species
Common name	Scientific name and subspecies	Range	Size and ecology	IUCN status and estimated population
Boyacá spiny rat	P. chrysaeolus (Thomas, 1898)	Colombia	Size: 21–22 cm (8–9 in) long, plus 14–16 cm (6 in) tail Habitat: Forest Diet: Wide variety of vegetation	DD Unknown
Colombian spiny rat	P. canicollis (Allen, 1899)	Colombia and Venezuela	Size: About 22 cm (9 in) long, plus about 17 cm (7 in) tail Habitat: Forest Diet: Wide variety of vegetation	LC Unknown
Cuvier's spiny rat	P. cuvieri Petter, 1978	Northern South America	Size: 21–23 cm (8–9 in) long, plus 14–17 cm (6–7 in) tail Habitat: Forest Diet: Wide variety of vegetation	LC Unknown
Gardner's spiny rat	P. gardneri Silva, 1998	Bolivia and western Brazil	Size: 15–21 cm (6–8 in) long, plus 8–16 cm (3–6 in) tail Habitat: Forest Diet: Wide variety of vegetation	DD Unknown
Goeldi's spiny rat	P. goeldii Thomas, 1905	Central Brazil	Size: 18–27 cm (7–11 in) long, plus 10–18 cm (4–7 in) tail Habitat: Forest Diet: Wide variety of vegetation	LC Unknown
Guaira spiny rat	P. guairae Thomas, 1901	Colombia and Venezuela	Size: 21–24 cm (8–9 in) long, plus 17–20 cm (7–8 in) tail Habitat: Forest Diet: Wide variety of vegetation	LC Unknown
Guyanan spiny-rat	P. hoplomyoides Tate, 1939	Northern South America	Size: About 21 cm (8 in) long, plus about 15 cm (6 in) tail Habitat: Forest Diet: Wide variety of vegetation	DD Unknown
Guyenne spiny rat	P. guyannensis (Geoffroy, 1803) Six subspecies: P. g. arabupu; P. g. arescens; P. g. cherriei; P. g. guyannensis; P. g. riparum; P. g. vacillator	Northern South America	Size: 18–23 cm (7–9 in) long, plus 11–19 cm (4–7 in) tail Habitat: Forest Diet: Wide variety of vegetation	LC Unknown
Kulina spiny rat	P. kulinae Silva, 1998	Peru and western Brazil	Size: 14–19 cm (6–7 in) long, plus 9–14 cm (4–6 in) tail Habitat: Forest Diet: Wide variety of vegetation	DD Unknown
Long-tailed spiny rat	P. longicaudatus (Rengger, 1830)	Central South America	Size: 22–25 cm (9–10 in) long, plus 13–15 cm (5–6 in) tail Habitat: Forest Diet: Wide variety of vegetation	LC Unknown
Minca spiny rat	P. mincae (Allen, 1899)	Northern Colombia	Size: 22–23 cm (9 in) long, plus 20–21 cm (8 in) tail Habitat: Forest Diet: Wide variety of vegetation	DD Unknown
Napo spiny rat	P. quadruplicatus Hershkovitz, 1948	Northern South America	Size: 21–29 cm (8–11 in) long, plus 12–20 cm (5–8 in) tail Habitat: Forest Diet: Wide variety of vegetation	LC Unknown
O'Connell's spiny rat	P. oconnelli Allen, 1913	Colombia	Size: About 25 cm (10 in) long, plus 18 cm (7 in) tail Habitat: Forest Diet: Wide variety of vegetation	DD Unknown
Pacific spiny rat	P. decumanus (Thomas, 1899)	Ecuador and Peru	Size: 26–30 cm (10–12 in) long, plus about 20 cm (8 in) tail Habitat: Forest Diet: Wide variety of vegetation	NT Unknown
Patton's spiny rat	P. pattoni Silva, 1998	Peru and western Brazil	Size: 14–20 cm (6–8 in) long, plus 10–15 cm (4–6 in) tail Habitat: Forest Diet: Wide variety of vegetation	LC Unknown
Robert's spiny rat	P. roberti Thomas, 1901	Central Brazil	Size: 20–23 cm (8–9 in) long, plus about 16 cm (6 in) tail Habitat: Forest and savanna Diet: Wide variety of vegetation	LC Unknown
Short-tailed spiny rat	P. brevicauda (Günther, 1877)	Western South America	Size: 18–25 cm (7–10 in) long, plus 13–17 cm (5–7 in) tail Habitat: Forest Diet: Wide variety of vegetation	LC Unknown
Simons's spiny rat	P. simonsi Thomas, 1900	Western South America	Size: 16–27 cm (6–11 in) long, plus 11–23 cm (4–9 in) tail Habitat: Forest Diet: Wide variety of vegetation	LC Unknown
Steere's spiny rat	P. steerei Goldman, 1911	Western South America	Size: 21–29 cm (8–11 in) long, plus 12–21 cm (5–8 in) tail Habitat: Forest Diet: Wide variety of vegetation	LC Unknown
Stiff-spine spiny rat	P. echinothrix Silva, 1998	Western Brazil	Size: 14–24 cm (6–9 in) long, plus 10–21 cm (4–8 in) tail Habitat: Forest Diet: Wide variety of vegetation	LC Unknown
Tome's spiny rat	P. semispinosus (Tomes, 1860) Ten subspecies: P. s. burrus; P. s. calidior; P. s. centralis; P. s. colombianus; P. s. goldmani; P. s. ignotus; P. s. panamensis; P. s. rosa; P. s. rubellus; P. s. semispinosus	Central America and northwestern South America	Size: About 29 cm (11 in) long, plus about 24 cm (9 in) tail Habitat: Forest Diet: Wide variety of vegetation	LC Unknown
Trinidad spiny rat	P. trinitatus (Allen & Chapman, 1893)	Northern Venezuela	Size: 26–27 cm (10–11 in) long, plus 20–21 cm (8–8 in) tail Habitat: Forest Diet: Wide variety of vegetation	DD Unknown

Genus Santamartamys – Emmons, 2005 – one species
Common name	Scientific name and subspecies	Range	Size and ecology	IUCN status and estimated population
Red-crested tree-rat	S. rufodorsalis (Allen, 1899)	Northern Colombia	Size: About 19 cm (7 in) long, plus about 27 cm (11 in) tail Habitat: Unknown Diet: Seeds and fruit	CR 1–50

Genus Thrichomys – Trouessart, 1880 – four species
Common name	Scientific name and subspecies	Range	Size and ecology	IUCN status and estimated population
Common punaré	T. apereoides (Lund, 1839)	Eastern Brazil	Size: 19–21 cm (7–8 in) long, plus 16–18 cm (6–7 in) tail Habitat: Savanna and shrubland Diet: Seeds, fruit, cacti, and insects	LC Unknown
Highlands punaré	T. inermis Pictet, 1841	Eastern Brazil	Size: 18–22 cm (7–9 in) long, plus 11–20 cm (4–8 in) tail Habitat: Forest, savanna, and rocky areas Diet: Seeds, fruit, cacti, and insects	LC Unknown
Paraguayan punaré	T. pachyurus (Wagner, 1845)	Southern Brazil	Size: Unknown Habitat: Forest and savanna Diet: Seeds, fruit, cacti, and insects	LC Unknown
Sao Lourenço punaré	T. laurentius Thomas, 1904	Eastern Brazil (in green/yellow)	Size: 12–24 cm (5–9 in) long, plus 13–21 cm (5–8 in) tail Habitat: Forest Diet: Seeds, fruit, cacti, and insects	DD Unknown

Genus Toromys – Iack-Ximenes, Vivo, & Percequillo, 2005 – two species
Common name	Scientific name and subspecies	Range	Size and ecology	IUCN status and estimated population
Giant tree-rat	T. grandis (Wagner, 1845)	Northern Brazil (in red)	Size: About 30 cm (12 in) long, plus about 28 cm (11 in) tail Habitat: Forest Diet: Vegetation	LC Unknown
Peruvian toro	T. rhipidura (Thomas, 1928)	Peru (in green)	Size: 21–26 cm (8–10 in) long, plus 18–21 cm (7–8 in) tail Habitat: Forest Diet: Vegetation	DD Unknown

=== Subfamily Euryzygomatomyinae ===
Genus Clyomys – Thomas, 1916 – one species
Common name	Scientific name and subspecies	Range	Size and ecology	IUCN status and estimated population
Broad-headed spiny rat	C. laticeps Thomas, 1909	Paraguay and southern Brazil	Size: 15–29 cm (6–11 in) long, plus 4–9 cm (2–4 in) tail Habitat: Savanna Diet: Vegetation	LC Unknown

Genus Euryzygomatomys – Goeldi, 1901 – one species
Common name	Scientific name and subspecies	Range	Size and ecology	IUCN status and estimated population
Fischer's guiara	E. spinosus (G. von Waldheim, 1814)	Southern Brazil and northeastern Argentina	Size: 16–20 cm (6–8 in) long, plus 6–7 cm (2–3 in) tail Habitat: Forest and grassland Diet: Vegetation	LC Unknown

Genus Trinomys – Thomas, 1921 – ten species
Common name	Scientific name and subspecies	Range	Size and ecology	IUCN status and estimated population
Dark-caped Atlantic spiny rat	T. mirapitanga Lara, Patton, & Hingst-Zaher, 2002	Eastern Brazil	Size: About 22 cm (9 in) long, plus 18–20 cm (7–8 in) tail Habitat: Forest Diet: Wide variety of vegetation	DD Unknown
Elias's Atlantic spiny rat	T. eliasi Pessoa & dos Reis, 1993	Southeastern Brazil	Size: 17–24 cm (7–9 in) long, plus 15–22 cm (6–9 in) tail Habitat: Forest and shrubland Diet: Wide variety of vegetation	NT Unknown
Gracile Atlantic spiny rat	T. gratiosus (Oliveira, 1948) Two subspecies: T. g. bonafidei; T. g. gratiosus	Southeastern Brazil	Size: 16–23 cm (6–9 in) long, plus 15–22 cm (6–9 in) tail Habitat: Forest Diet: Wide variety of vegetation	LC Unknown
Hairy Atlantic spiny rat	T. setosus (Desmarest, 1817) Three subspecies: T. s. denigratus; T. s. elegans; T. s. setosus	Southeastern Brazil	Size: 18–23 cm (7–9 in) long, plus 16–23 cm (6–9 in) tail Habitat: Forest and savanna Diet: Wide variety of vegetation	LC Unknown
Ihering's Atlantic spiny rat	T. iheringi (Thomas, 1911)	Eastern Brazil	Size: 18–22 cm (7–9 in) long, plus 17–22 cm (7–9 in) tail Habitat: Forest Diet: Wide variety of vegetation	LC Unknown
Moojen's Atlantic spiny rat	T. moojeni Pessôa, Oliveira, & Reis, 1992	Southeastern Brazil	Size: 15–18 cm (6–7 in) long, plus 14–18 cm (6–7 in) tail Habitat: Forest and savanna Diet: Wide variety of vegetation	EN Unknown
Soft-spined Atlantic spiny rat	T. dimidiatus (Günther, 1877)	Southeastern Brazil	Size: 17–24 cm (7–9 in) long, plus 15–22 cm (6–9 in) tail Habitat: Shrubland Diet: Wide variety of vegetation	LC Unknown
Spiked Atlantic spiny rat	T. paratus Oliveira, 1948	Southeastern Brazil	Size: 18–27 cm (7–11 in) long, plus 17–23 cm (7–9 in) tail Habitat: Forest Diet: Wide variety of vegetation	DD Unknown
White-spined Atlantic spiny rat	T. albispinus (Geoffroy, 1838) Three subspecies: T. a. albispinus; T. a. minor; T. a. serotinus	Eastern Brazil	Size: 15–19 cm (6–7 in) long, plus 14–18 cm (6–7 in) tail Habitat: Forest, savanna, shrubland, grassland, and rocky areas Diet: Wide variety of vegetation	LC Unknown
Yonenaga's Atlantic spiny rat	T. yonenagae (Rocha, 1995)	Eastern Brazil	Size: 14–20 cm (6–8 in) long, plus 16–22 cm (6–9 in) tail Habitat: Savanna Diet: Wide variety of vegetation	EN Unknown

=== Subfamily Heteropsomyinae ===
Genus Boromys † – Miller, 1916 – two species
Common name	Scientific name and subspecies	Range	Size and ecology	IUCN status and estimated population
Oriente cave rat †	B. offella Miller, 1916	Cuba	Size: Unknown Habitat: Unknown Diet: Unknown	EX 0
Torre's cave rat †	B. torrei Allen, 1917	Cuba	Size: Unknown Habitat: Unknown Diet: Unknown	EX 0

Genus Brotomys † – Miller, 1916 – two species
Common name	Scientific name and subspecies	Range	Size and ecology	IUCN status and estimated population
Haitian edible rat †	B. contractus Miller, 1916	Haiti	Size: Unknown Habitat: Unknown Diet: Unknown	EX 0
Hispaniolan edible rat †	B. voratus Miller, 1916	Dominican Republic	Size: Unknown Habitat: Unknown Diet: Unknown	EX 0

Genus Heteropsomys † – Anthony, 1916 – two species
Common name	Scientific name and subspecies	Range	Size and ecology	IUCN status and estimated population
Antillean cave rat †	H. antillensis Anthony, 1916	Puerto Rico	Size: Unknown Habitat: Unknown Diet: Unknown	EX 0
Insular cave rat †	H. insulans Anthony, 1916	Puerto Rico	Size: Unknown Habitat: Unknown Diet: Unknown	EX 0

== Sources ==
- Chernasky, Amy; Motis, Anna; Burgin, Connor, eds. (2023). All the Mammals of the World. Lynx Nature Books. ISBN 978-84-16728-66-4.
- Nowak, Ronald M. (1999). Walker's Mammals of the World. Vol. 2 (6th ed.). Johns Hopkins University Press. ISBN 978-0-8018-5789-8.
- Upham, Nathan S.; Patterson, Bruce D. (2015). Vassallo, A. I.; Antenucci, D. (eds.). Biology of Caviomorph Rodents: Diversity and Evolution. Sociedad Argentina para el Estudio de los Mamíferos Series A Mammalogical Research. ISBN 978-987-98497-3-6.
- Woods, Charles A.; Kilpatrick, C. William (2005). Wilson, Don E.; Reeder, DeeAnn M. (eds.). Mammal Species of the World. Vol. 2 (3rd ed.). Johns Hopkins University Press. ISBN 978-0-8018-8221-0.
