= List of threatened mammals of Brazil =

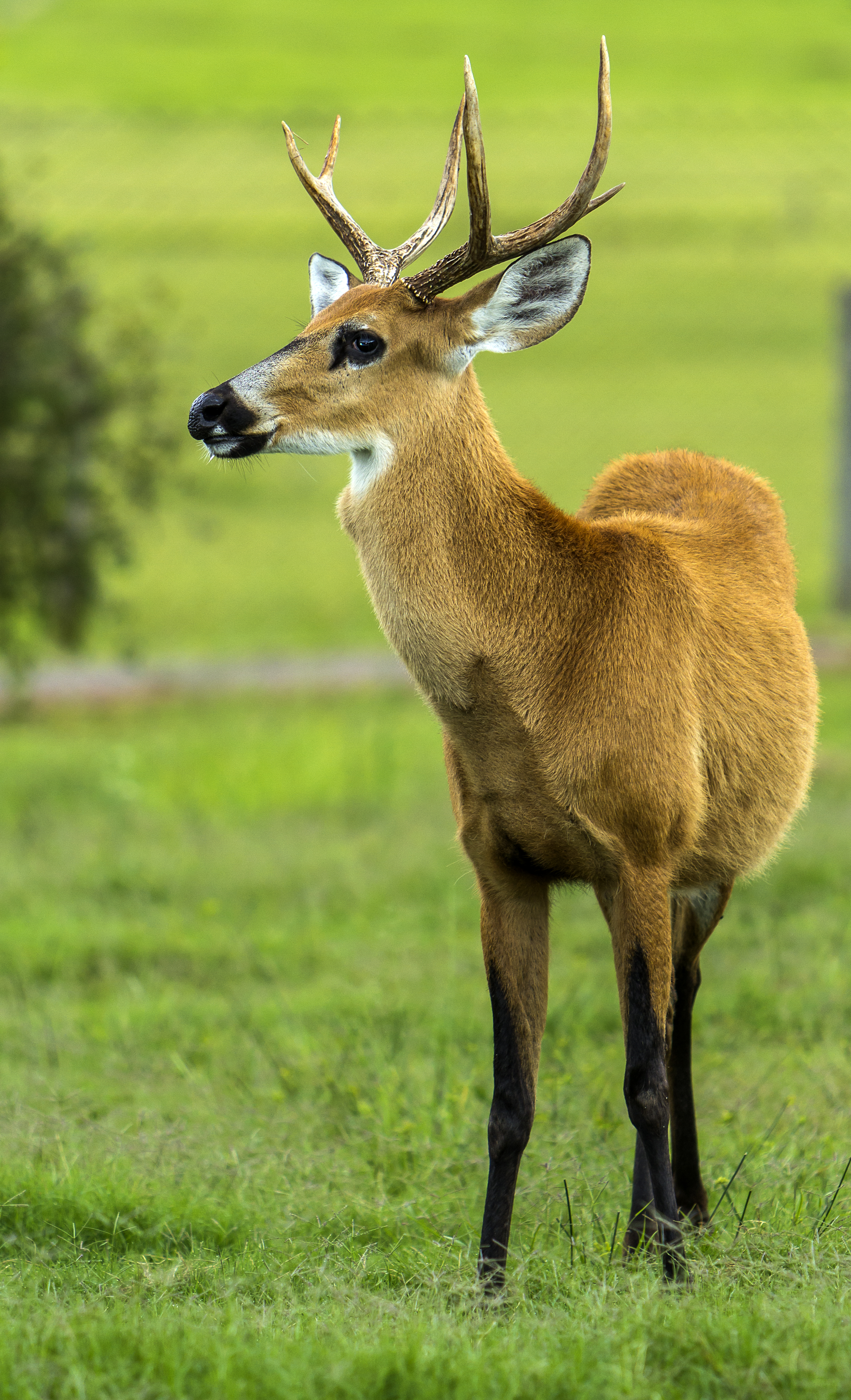
The marsh deer (Blastocerus dichotomus) is a vulnerable species according to ICMBio and IUCN.

There are more than 700 species of mammals in Brazil, and according to the Chico Mendes Institute for Biodiversity Conservation and Brazil's Ministry of the Environment, about 110 species and subspecies are threatened and one is extinct. The Brazilian definition of "threatened species" uses the same criteria and categories established by IUCN. Among the 12 mammal orders which occur in Brazil, eleven have threatened species, except Lagomorpha (which has only one species in Brazil, the Brazilian cottontail). Although the rodents have been the most diverse order of mammals, the order with most species on this list is the Primates (34 species).

This list of threatened species was published in Diário Oficial da União, on December 17, 2014. Even though some species have been removed from the list, (for instance, the humpback whale), the number of threatened species has increased in comparison with the former list (which had had 69 species). The Brazilian tapir, the white-lipped peccary, the short-eared dog and many rodents have been included in the list. Many of them are just regionally threatened. In spite of using the same criteria, ICMBio list often shows a different conservation status than IUCN. That is because the assessments were done at different times by different researchers.

Most Brazilian mammals are considered to be vulnerable. In contrast with the former list, one species is considered extinct (Vespucci's rodent) and two might be extinct in Brazil (black-shouldered opossum and candango mouse; "probably extinct" - PEx).

== Threatened mammals of Brazil - ICMBio (2014) ==
=== Order Didelphimorphia (opossums) ===
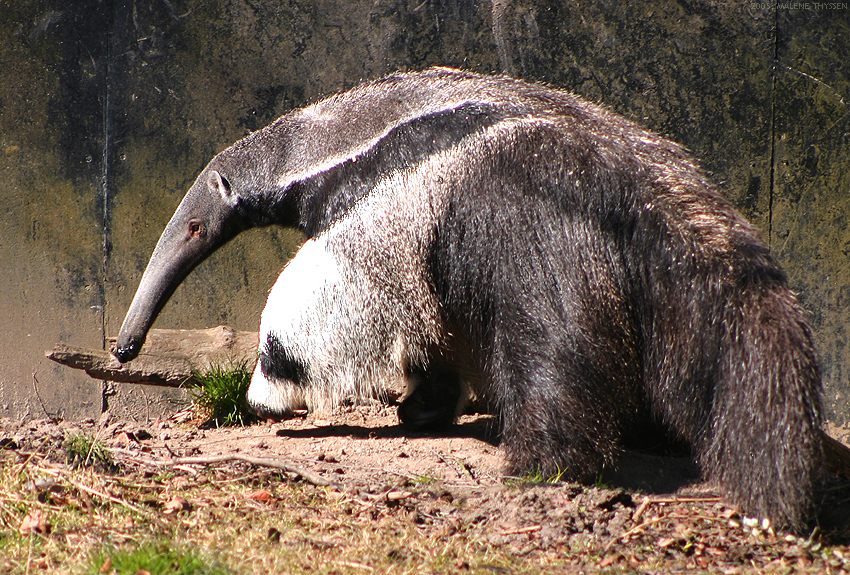
The giant anteater (Myrmecophaga tridactyla) is a vulnerable species.

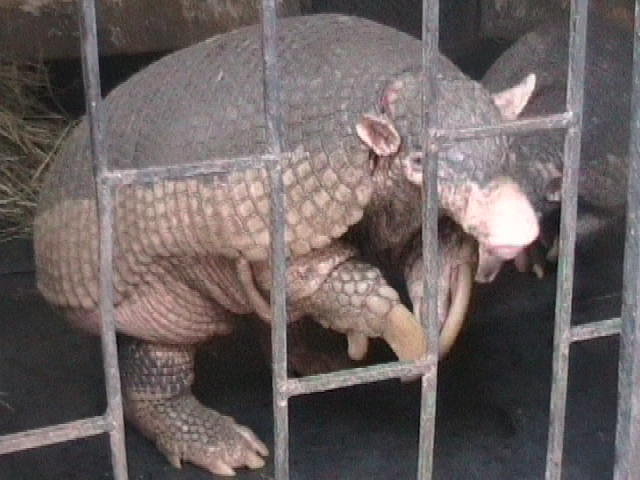
The giant armadillo (Priodontes maximus) is a vulnerable species.

Family Didelphidae

- Caluromysiops irrupta (black-shouldered opossum) LC^{IUCN} - ICMBio status CRPEx
- Marmosops paulensis (Brazilian slender opossum) LC^{IUCN} - ICMBio status VU
- Thylamys macrurus (Paraguayan fat-tailed mouse opossum) NT^{IUCN} - ICMBio status EN
- Thylamys velutinus (dwarf fat-tailed mouse opossum) LC^{IUCN} - ICMBio status VU

=== Order Pilosa (anteaters and sloths) ===
Family Bradypodidae (three-toed sloths)

- Bradypus torquatus (maned sloth) VU^{IUCN} - ICMBio status VU

Family Myrmecophagidae (anteaters)

- Myrmecophaga tridactyla (giant anteater) VU^{IUCN} - ICMBio status VU

=== Order Cingulata (armadillos) ===
Family Dasypodidae

- Priodontes maximus (giant armadillo) VU^{IUCN} - ICMBio status VU
- Tolypeutes tricinctus (Brazilian three-banded armadillo) VU^{IUCN} - ICMBio status VU

=== Order Chiroptera (bats) ===
Family Furipteridae (smoky bats)

- Furipterus horrens (thumbless bat) LC^{IUCN} - ICMBio status VU

Family Natalidae (funnel-eared bats)

- Natalus macrourus (Brazilian funnel-eared bat) NE - ICMBio status VU

Family Phyllostomidae (New World leaf-nosed bats)

- Glyphonycteris behnii (Behn's bat) DD^{IUCN} - ICMBio status VU
- Lonchophylla aurita (NR) - ICMBio status VU
- Lonchophylla dekeyseri (Dekeyser's nectar bat) NT^{IUCN} - ICMBio status VU
- Xeronycteris vieirai (Vieira's long-tongued bat) DD^{IUCN} - ICMBio status VU

Family Vespertilionidae (vesper bats)

- Eptesicus taddeii NE - ICMBio status VU

=== Order Primates (monkeys, marmosets, tamarins) ===
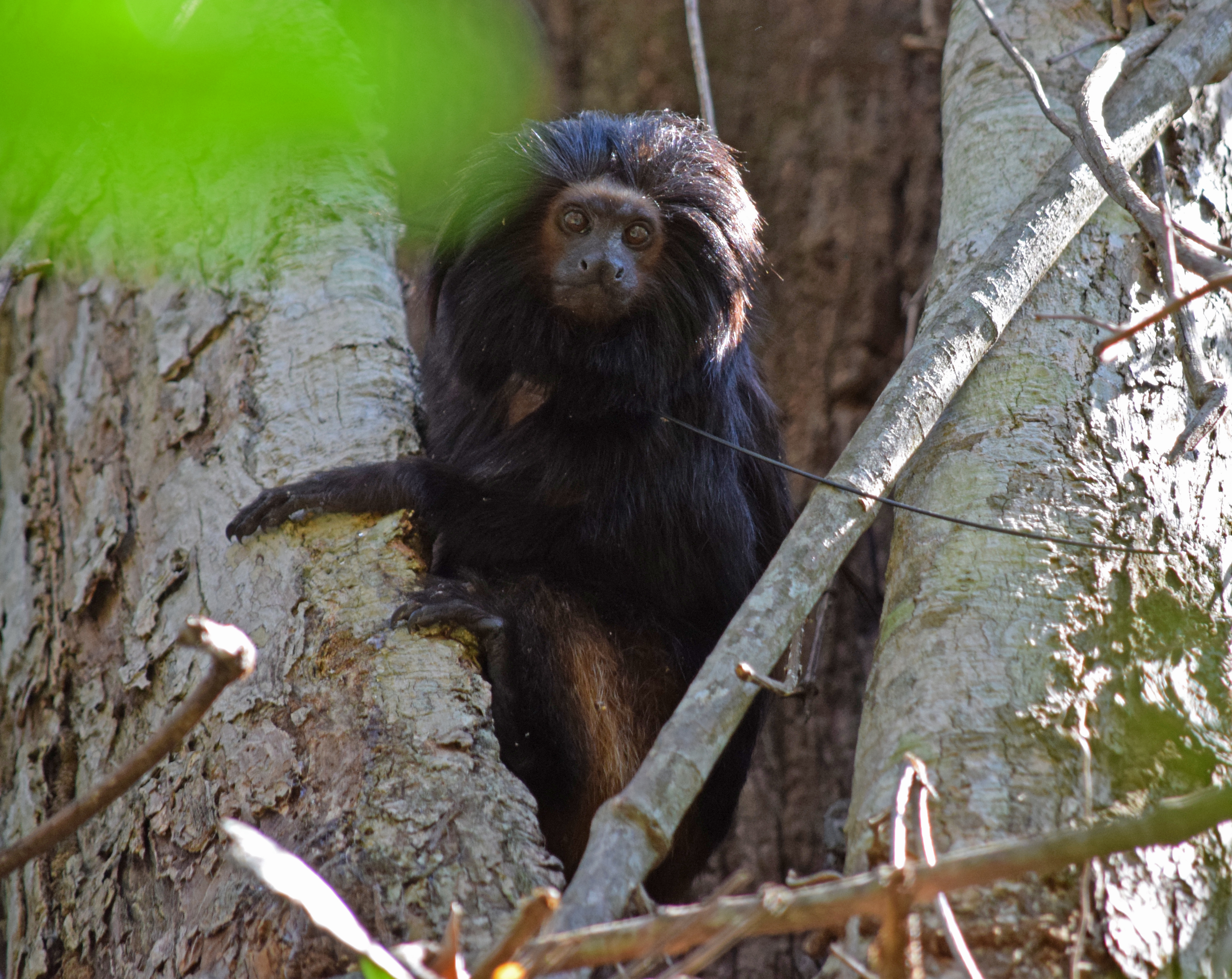
The black lion tamarin (Leontopithecus chrysopygus) is an endangered species from São Paulo inland.

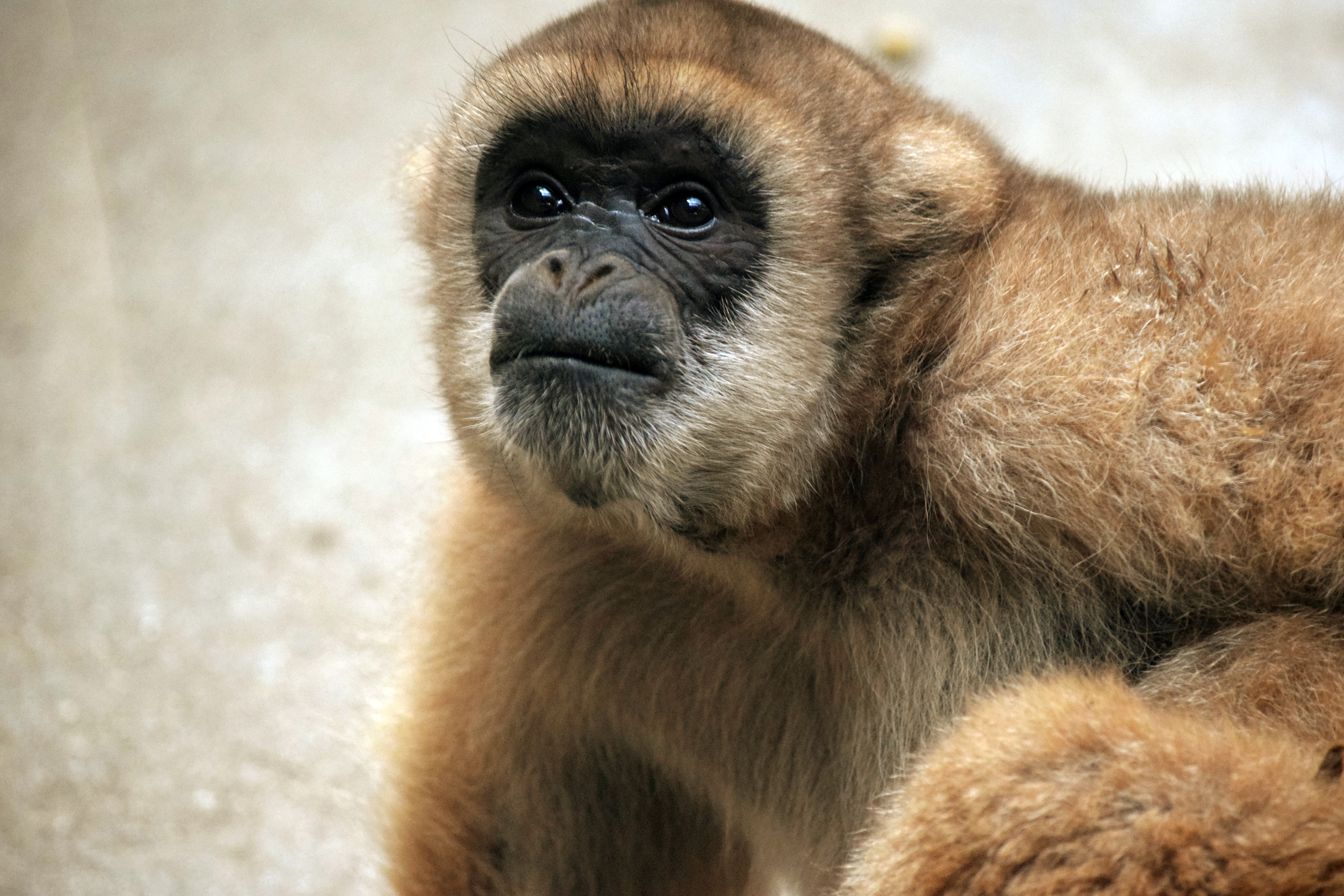
The southern muriqui (Brachyteles arachnoides) is an endangered species from the Serra do Mar coastal forests from São Paulo and Paraná.

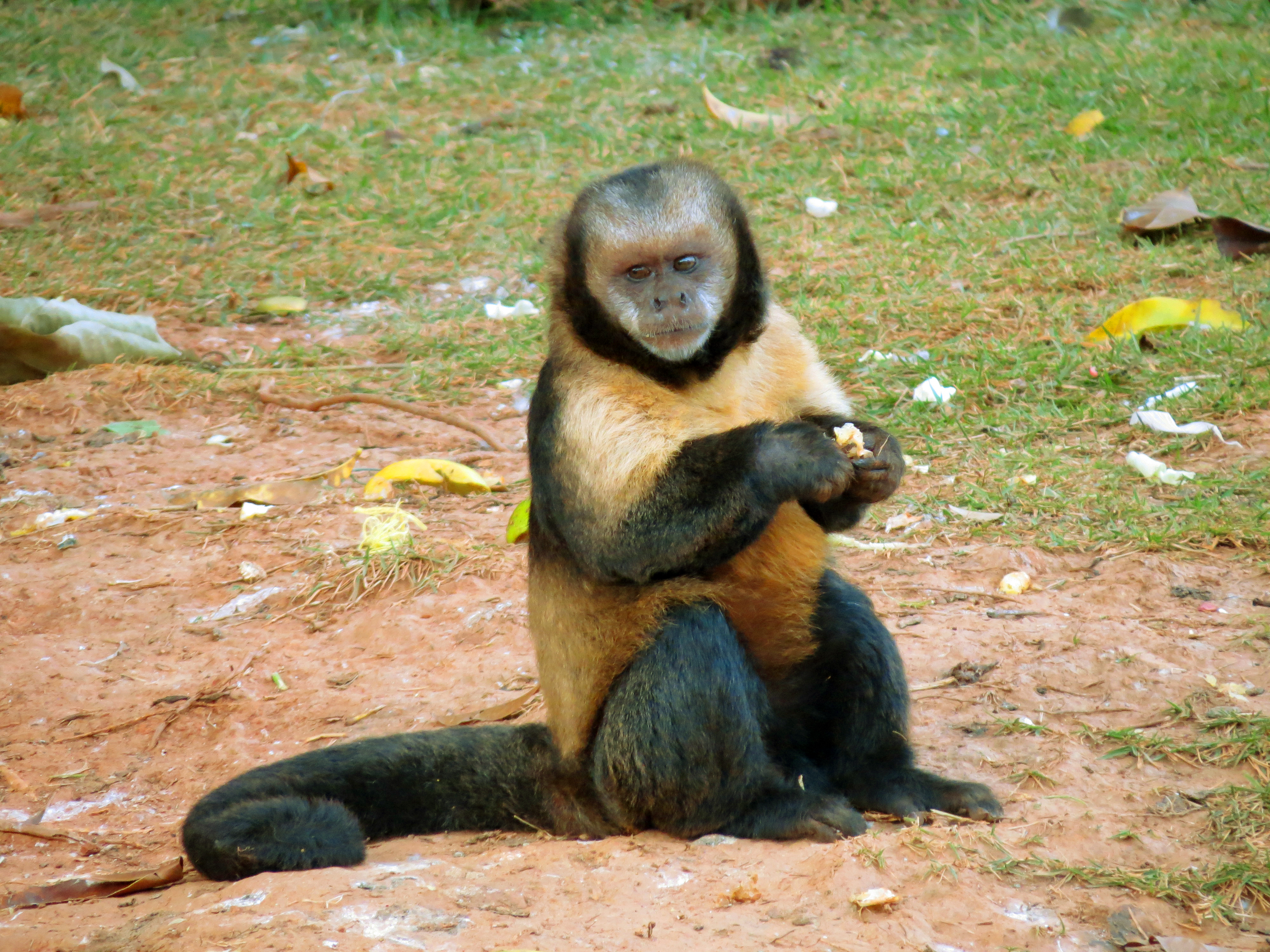
The golden-bellied capuchin (Sapajus xanthosternos) is a critically endangered species from the Bahia coastal forests.

Family Atelidae (howlers, spider and woolly monkeys, muriquis)

- Alouatta belzebul (red-handed howler) VU^{IUCN} - ICMBio status VU
- Alouatta discolor (Spix's red-handed howler) VU^{IUCN} - ICMBio status VU
- Alouatta guariba clamitans (southern brown howler) LC^{IUCN} - ICMBio status VU
- Alouatta guariba guariba (northern brown howler) CR^{IUCN} - ICMBio status CR
- Alouatta ululata (Maranhão red-handed howler) EN^{IUCN} - ICMBio status EN
- Ateles belzebuth (white-bellied spider monkey) EN^{IUCN} - ICMBio status VU
- Ateles chamek (Peruvian spider monkey) EN^{IUCN} - ICMBio status VU
- Ateles marginatus (white-cheeked spider monkey) EN^{IUCN} - ICMBio status EN
- Brachyteles arachnoides (southern muriqui) EN^{IUCN} - ICMBio status EN
- Brachyteles hypoxanthus (northern muriqui) CR^{IUCN} - ICMBio status CR
- Lagothrix cana cana (gray woolly monkey) EN^{IUCN} - ICMBio status EN
- Lagothrix lagothricha (brown woolly monkey) VU^{IUCN} - ICMBio status VU
- Lagothrix poeppigii (silvery woolly monkey) VU^{IUCN} - ICMBio status VU

Famlily Callitrichidae (tamarins and marmosets)

- Callithrix aurita (buffy-tufted marmoset) VU^{IUCN} - ICMBio status EN
- Callithrix flaviceps (buffy-headed marmoset) EN^{IUCN} - ICMBio status EN
- Leontopithecus caissara (Superagui lion tamarin) CR^{IUCN} - ICMBio status EN
- Leontopithecus chrysomelas (golden-headed lion tamarin) EN^{IUCN} - ICMBio status EN
- Leontopithecus chrysopygus (black lion tamarin) EN^{IUCN} - ICMBio status EN
- Leontopithecus rosalia (golden lion tamarin) EN^{IUCN} - ICMBio status EN
- Mico rondoni (Rondon's marmoset) VU^{IUCN} - ICMBio status VU
- Saguinus bicolor (pied tamarin) EN^{IUCN} - ICMBio status CR
- Saguinus niger (black tamarin) VU^{IUCN} - ICMBio status VU

Family Cebidae (capuchins and squirrel monkeys)

- Cebus kaapori (Kaapori capuchin) CR^{IUCN} - ICMBio status CR
- Saimiri vanzolinii (black squirrel monkey) VU^{IUCN} - ICMBio status VU
- Sapajus cay (Azaras's capuchin) LC^{IUCN} - ICMBio status VU
- Sapajus flavius (blond capuchin) CR^{IUCN} - ICMBio status EN
- Sapajus robustus (crested capuchin) EN^{IUCN} - ICMBio status EN
- Sapajus xanthosternos (golden-bellied capuchin) CR^{IUCN} - ICMBio status EN

Family Pitheciidae (titis, saki monkeys and uakaris)

- Cacajao hosomi (Neblina uakari) VU^{IUCN} - ICMBio status EN
- Callicebus barbarabrownae (Barbara Brown's titi) CR^{IUCN} - ICMBio status CR
- Callicebus coimbrai (Coimbra Filho's titi) EN^{IUCN} - ICMBio status CR
- Callicebus melanochir (coastal black-handed titi) VU^{IUCN} - ICMBio status VU
- Callicebus personatus (Atlantic titi) VU^{IUCN} - ICMBio status VU
- Chiropotes satanas (black bearded saki) CR^{IUCN} - ICMBio status EN
- Chiropotes utahicki (Uta Hick's bearded saki) EN^{IUCN} - ICMBio status VU

=== Order Carnivora (cats, dogs and relatives) ===
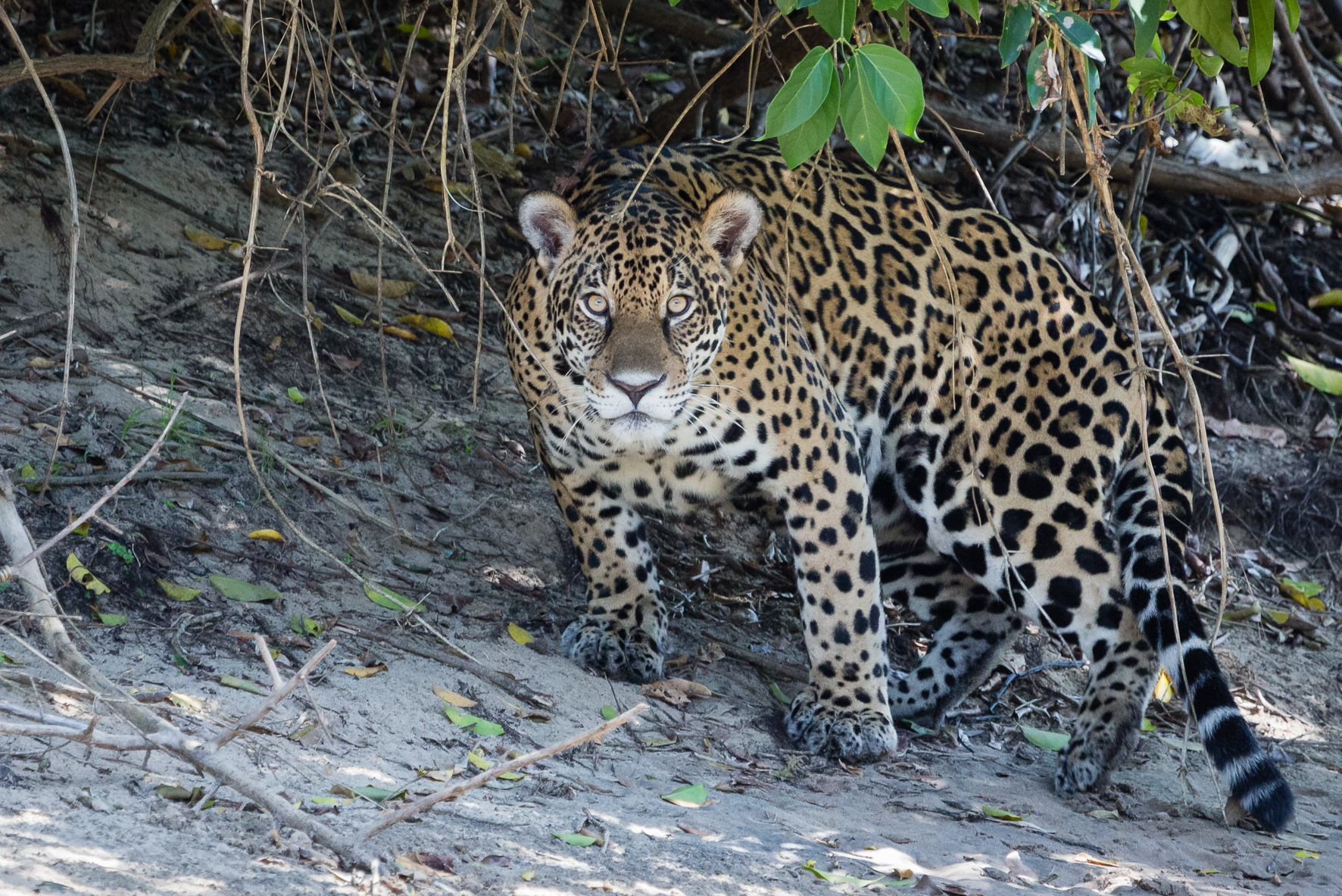
The jaguar (Panthera onca) is a vulnerablefelid.

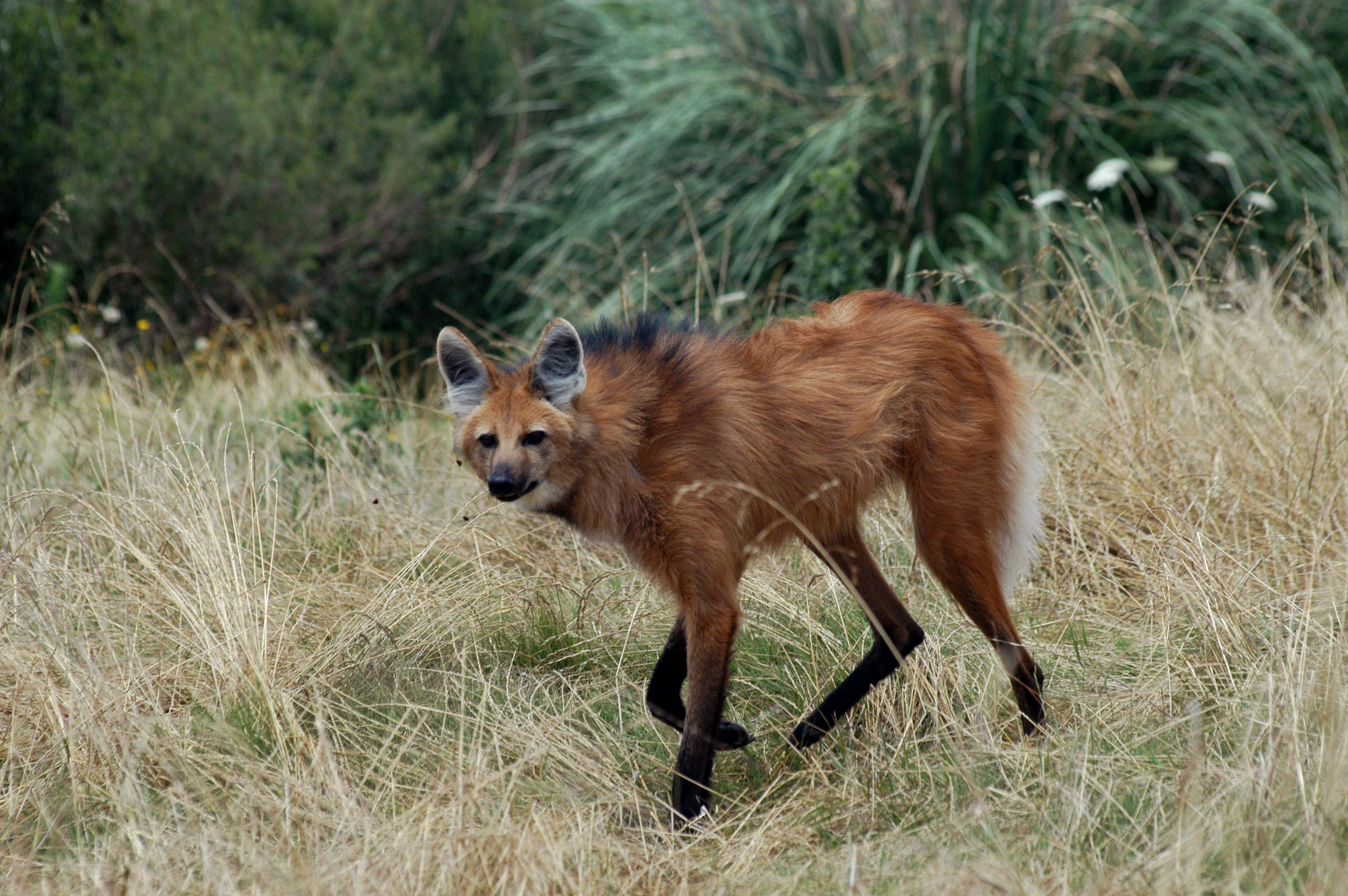
The maned wolf (Chrysocyon brachiurus) is a vulnerable canid.

Family Canidae (dogs)

- Atelocynus microtis (short-eared dog) NT^{IUCN} - ICMBio status VU
- Chrysocyon brachyurus (maned wolf) NT^{IUCN} - ICMBio status VU
- Lycalopex vetulus (hoary fox) LC^{IUCN} - ICMBio status VU
- Speothos venaticus (bush dog) NT^{IUCN} - ICMBio status VU

Family Mustelidae (otters)

- Pteronura brasiliensis (giant otter) EN^{IUCN} - ICMBio status VU

Family Felidae (cats)

- Leopardus colocolo (colocolo) NT^{IUCN} - ICMBio status VU
- Leopardus geoffroyi (Geoffroy's cat) LC^{IUCN} - ICMBio status VU
- Leopardus guttulus (southern tigrina) NE - ICMBio status VU
- Leopardus tigrinus (oncilla) EN^{IUCN} - ICMBio status EN
- Leopardus wiedii (margay) NT^{IUCN} - ICMBio status VU
- Puma concolor (cougar) LC^{IUCN} - ICMBio status VU
- Puma yagouaroundi (jaguarundi) LC^{IUCN} - ICMBio status VU
- Panthera onca (jaguar) NT^{IUCN} - ICMBio status VU

=== Order Cetacea (whales and dolphins) ===
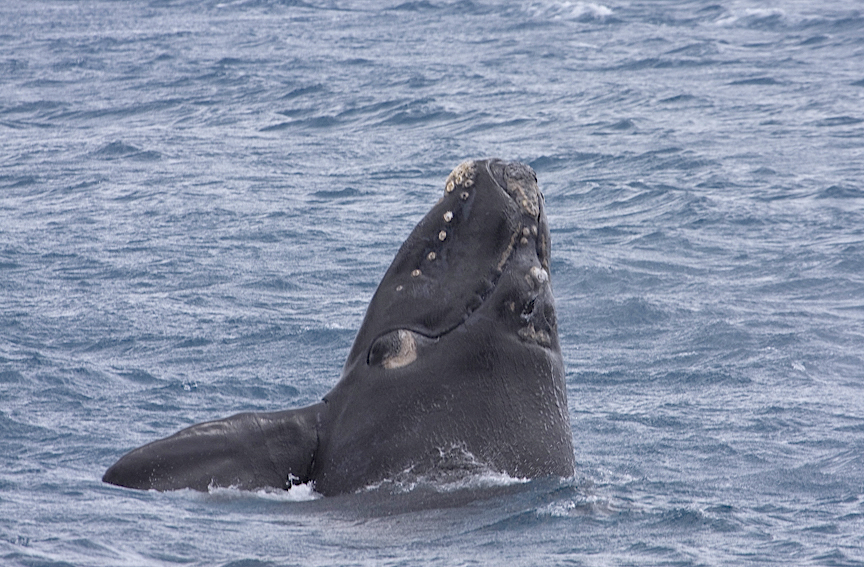
The southern right whale (Eubalaena australis) is an endangered species.

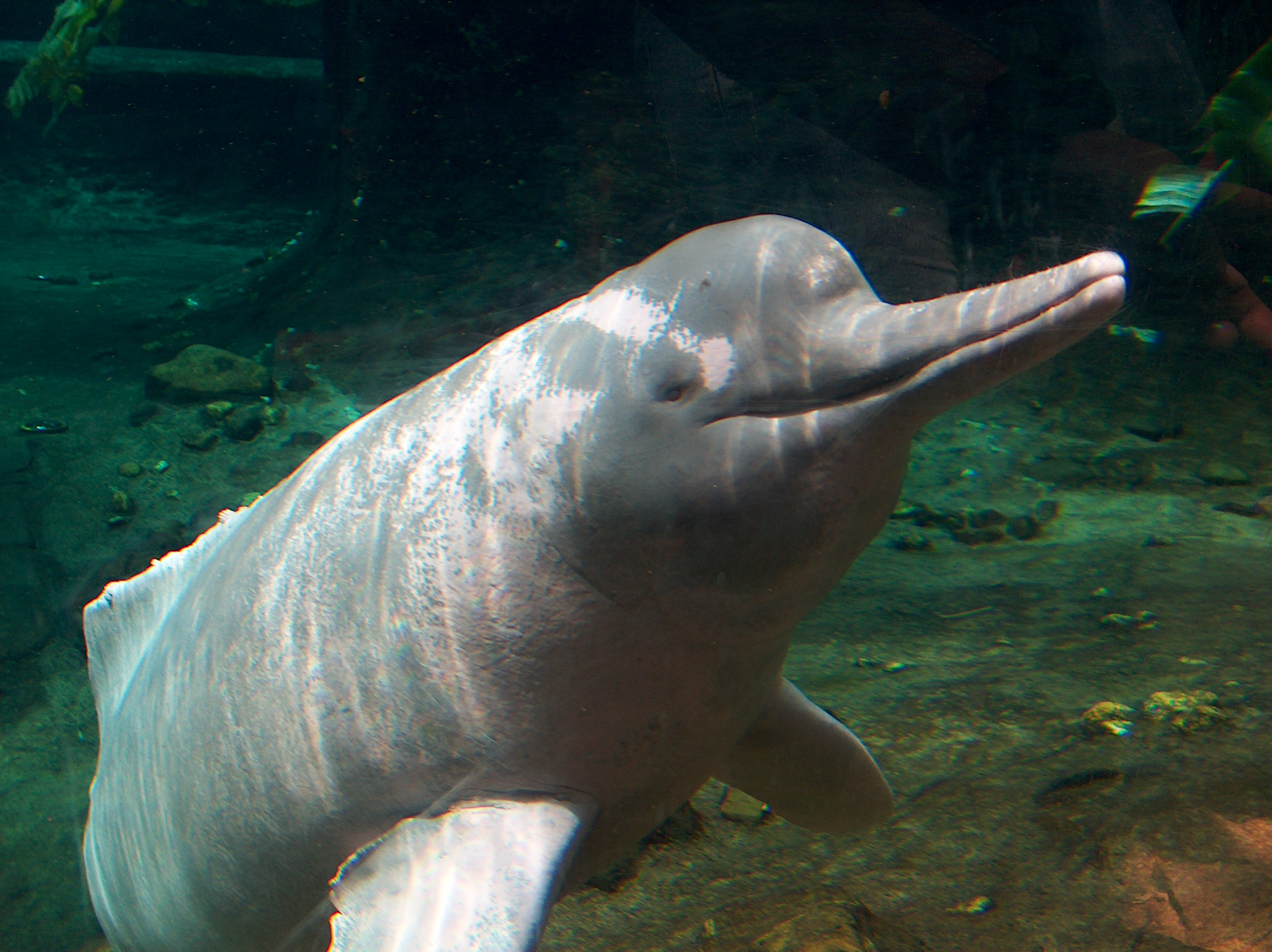
The Amazon river dolphin (Inia geoffrensis) is a vulnerable river dolphin from the Amazon basin.

Family Balaenidae (whales)

- Eubalaena australis (southern right whale) LC^{IUCN} - ICMBio status EN

Family Balaenopteridae (rorquals)

- Balaenoptera musculus (blue whale) EN^{IUCN} - ICMBio status CR
- Balaenoptera physalus (fin whale) EN^{IUCN} - ICMBio status EN
- Balaenoptera borealis (sei whale) EN^{IUCN} - ICMBio status EN

Family Delphinidae (dolphins)

- Sotalia guianensis (Guiana dolphin) DD^{IUCN} - ICMBio status VU

Family Iniidae (river dolphins)

- Inia geoffrensis (Amazon river dolphin) DD^{IUCN} - ICMBio status EN

Family Physeteridae (sperm whales)

- Physeter macrocephalus (sperm whale) VU^{IUCN} - ICMBio status VU

Family Pontoporiidae (river dolphins)

- Pontoporia blainvillei (La Plata dolphin) VU^{IUCN} - ICMBio status CR

=== Order Sirenia (manatees) ===
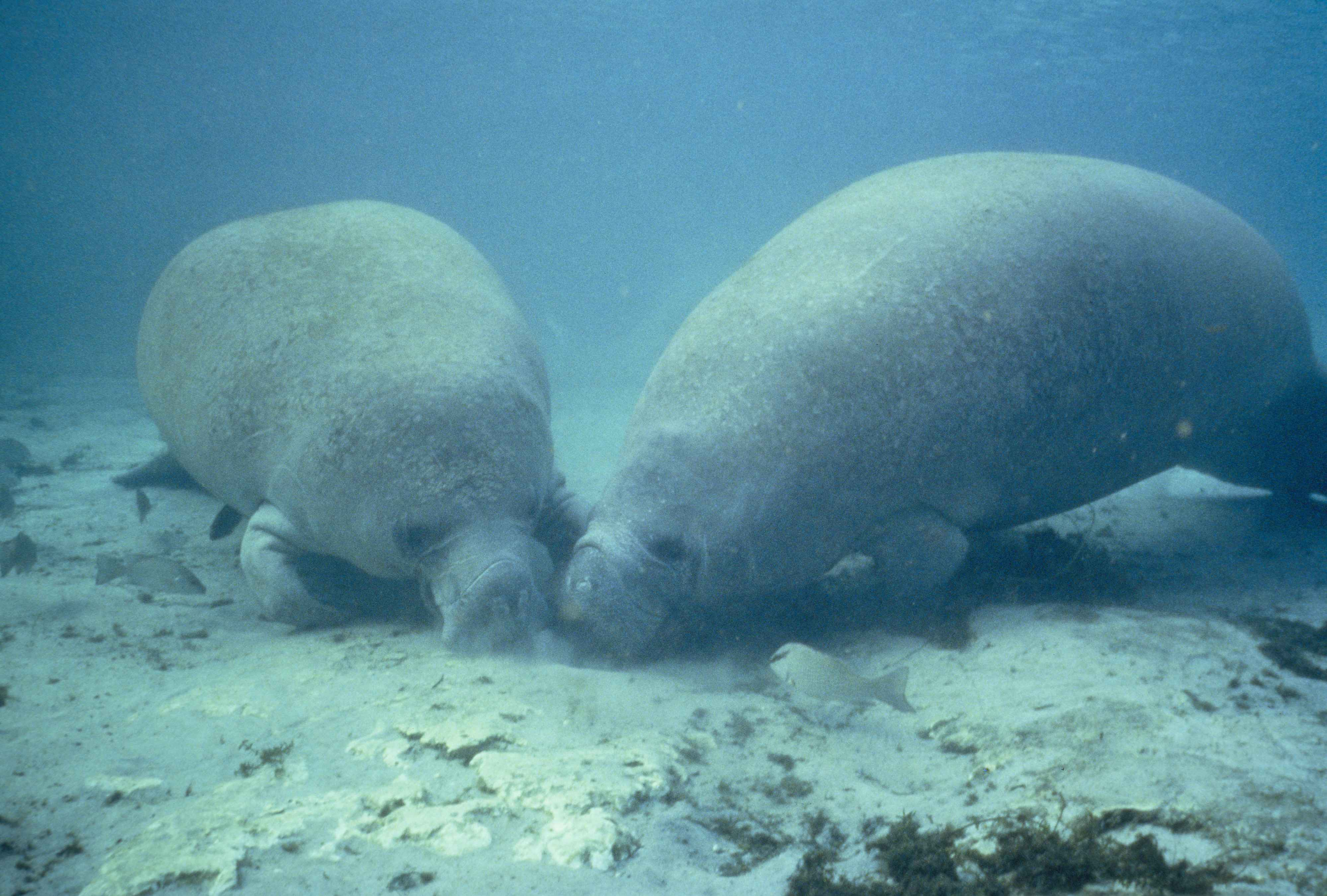
The West Indian manatee (Trichechus manatus) is critically endangered in Brazil.

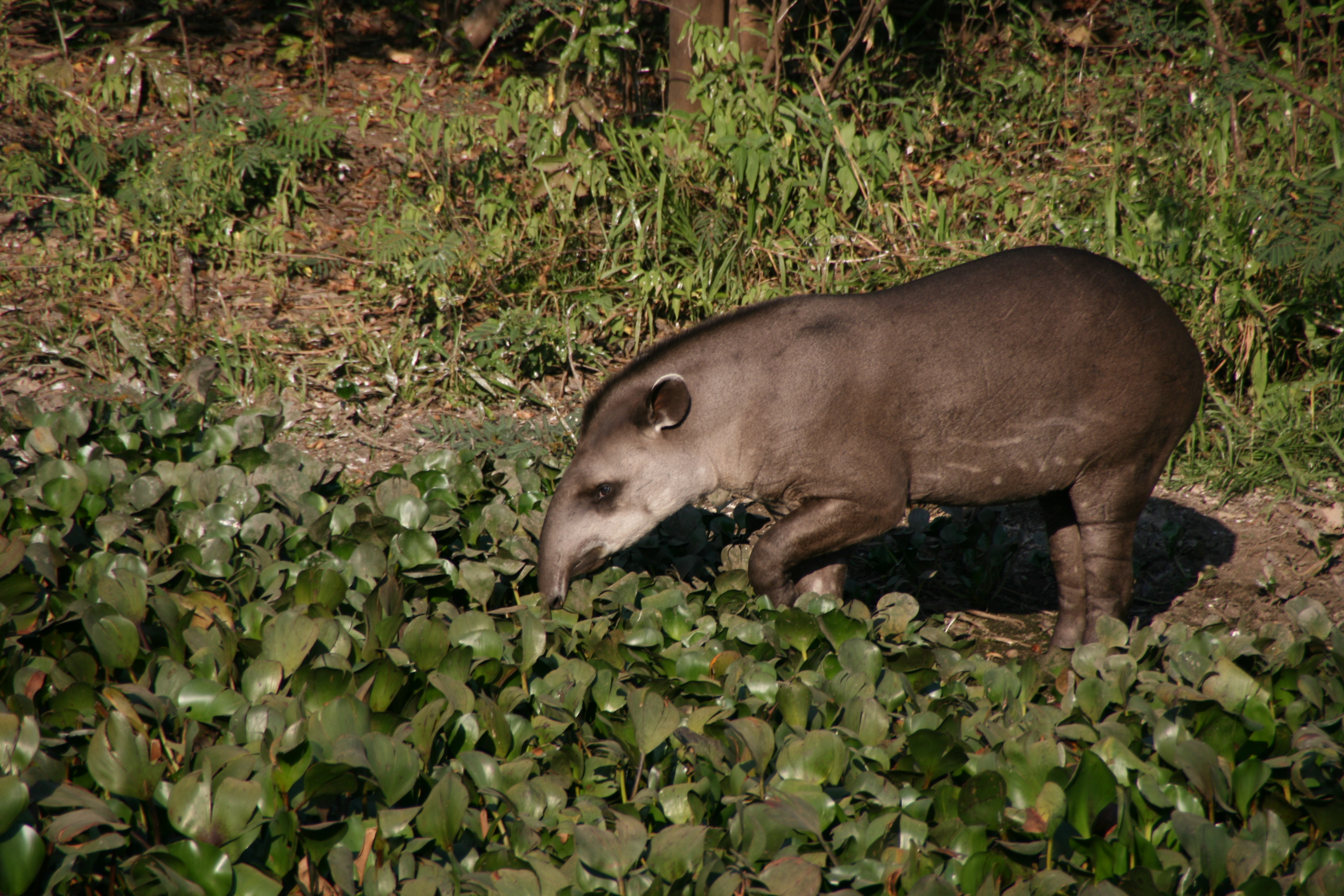
The Brazilian tapir (Tapirus terrestris) is the only Brazilian odd-toed ungulate and it is a vulnerable species.

Family Trichechidae

- Trichechus inunguis (Amazonian manatee) VU^{IUCN} - ICMBio status VU
- Trichechus manatus (West Indian manatee) VU^{IUCN} - ICMBio status CR

=== Order Perissodactyla (odd-toed ungulates) ===
Family Tapiridae (tapirs)

- Tapirus terrestris (Brazilian tapir) VU^{IUCN} - ICMBio status VU

=== Order Artiodactyla (even-toed ungulates) ===
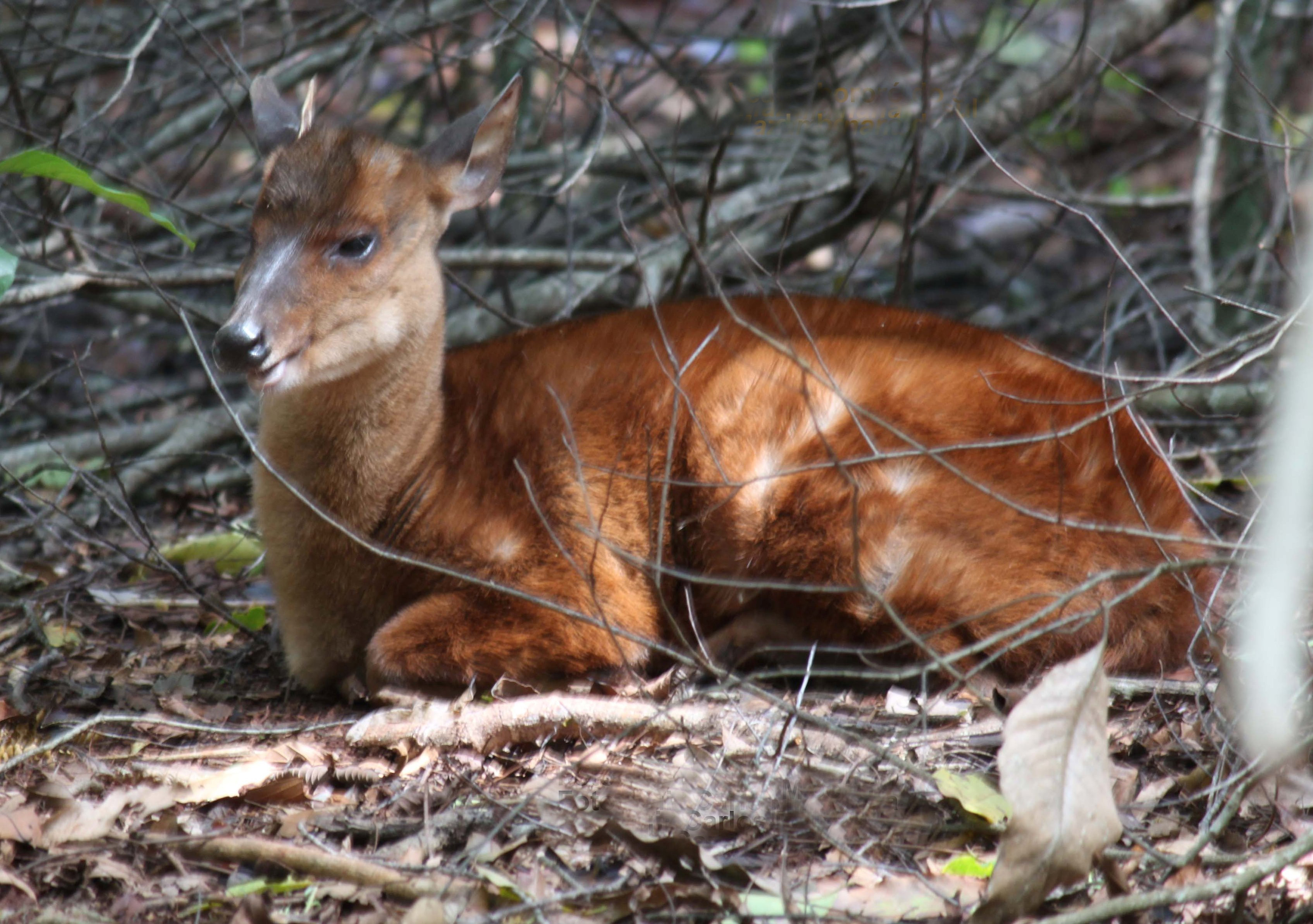
The pygmy brocket (Mazama nana) is a brocket deer from southern Brazil and it is a critically endangered species.

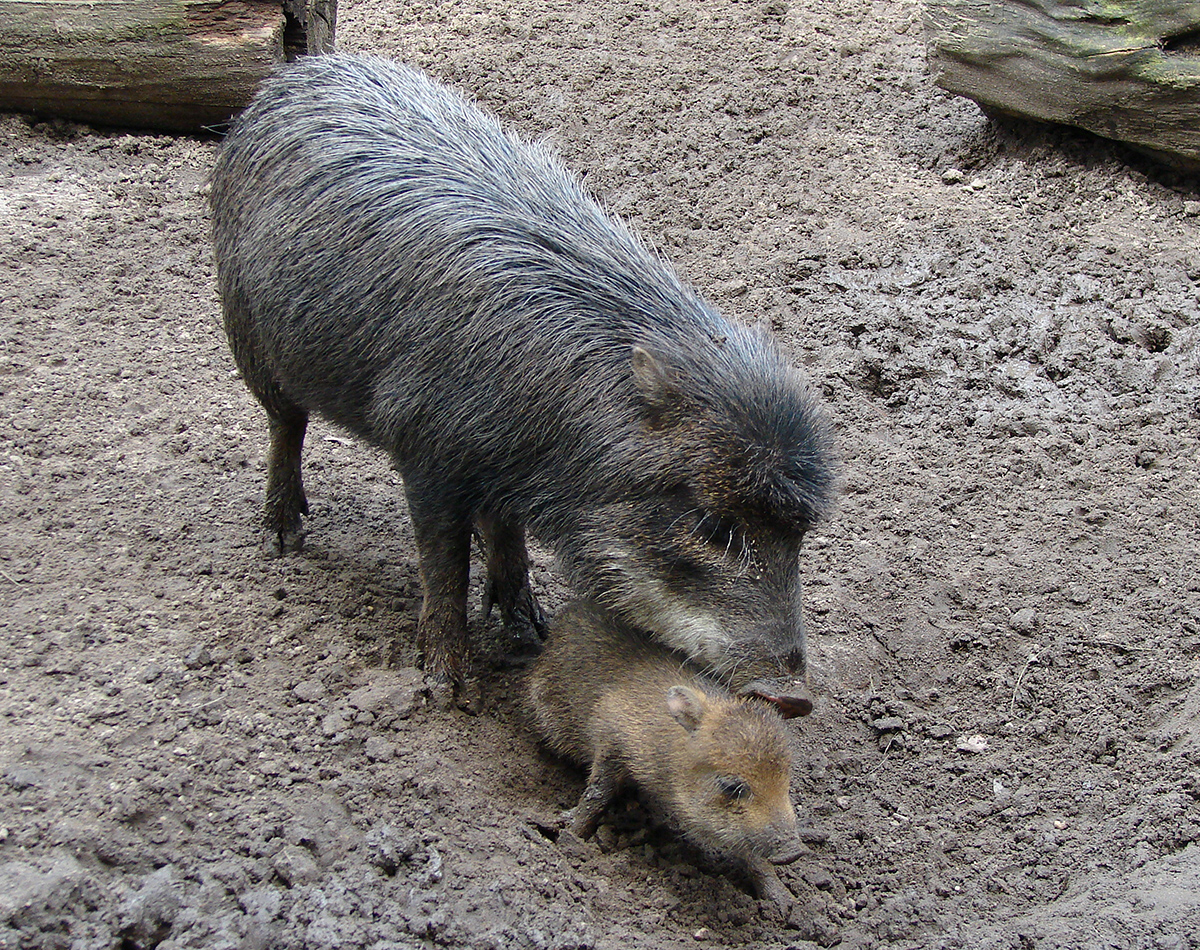
The white-lipped peccary (Tayassu pecari) is vulnerable species in Brazil.

Family Cervidae (deers)

- Blastocerus dichotomus (marsh deer) VU^{IUCN} - ICMBio status VU
- Mazama bororo (small red brocket) VU^{IUCN} - ICMBio status VU
- Mazama nana (pygmy brocket) VU^{IUCN} - ICMBio status CR
- Ozotoceros bezoarticus bezoarticus (Pampas deer) NE - ICMBio status VU
- Ozotoceros bezoarticus leucogaster (Pampas deer) NE - ICMBio status VU

Family Tayassuidae (peccaries)

- Tayassu pecari (white-lipped peccary) VU^{IUCN} - ICMBio status VU

=== Order Rodentia (rodents) ===
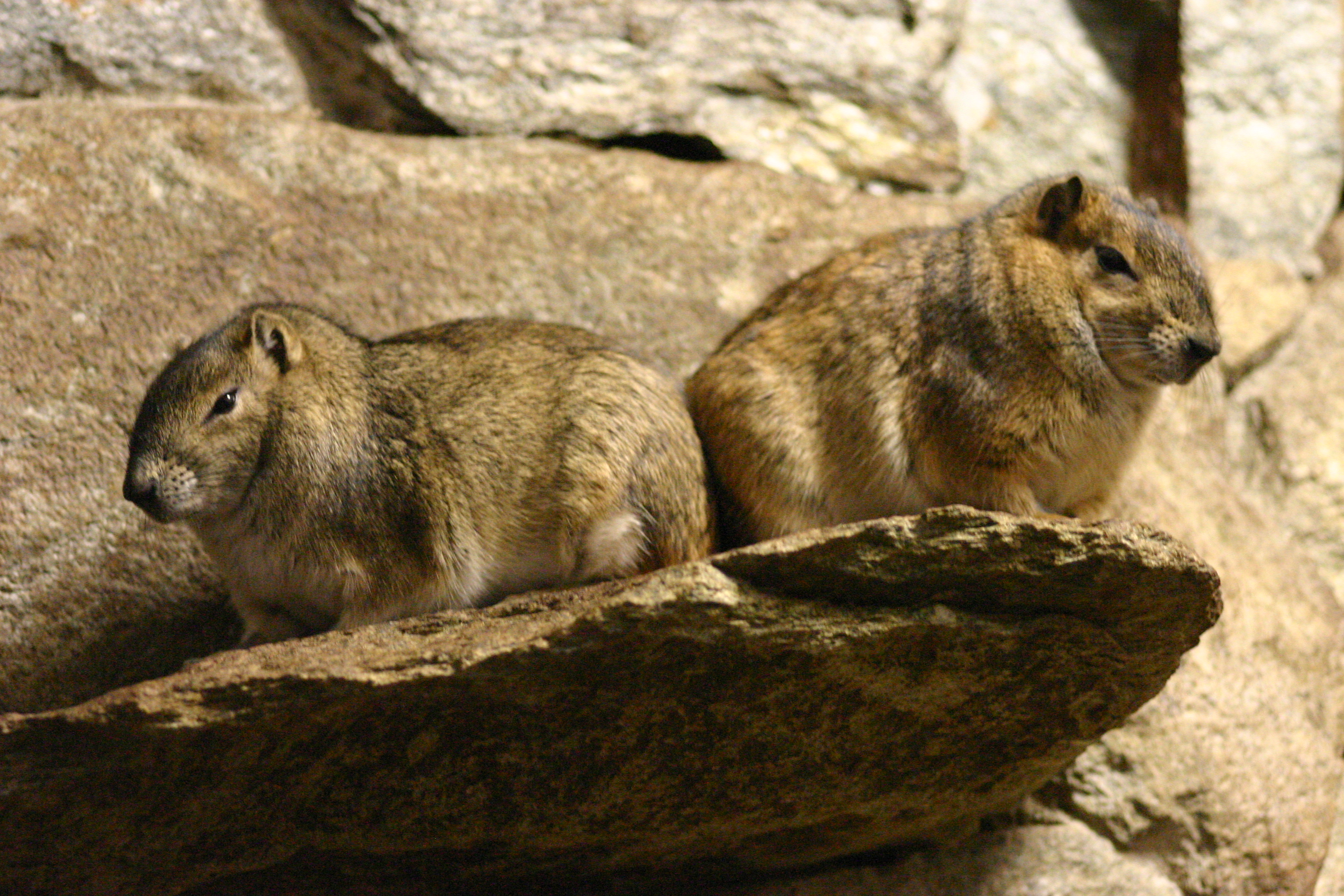
The rock cavy (Kerodon rupestris) is vulnerable species.

Family Caviidae (cavies)

- Cavia intermedia (Santa Catarina's guinea pig) CR^{IUCN} - ICMBio status CR
- Kerodon acrobata (acrobatic cavy) DD^{IUCN} - ICMBio status VU
- Kerodon rupestris (rock cavy) LC^{IUCN} - ICMBio status VU

Family Cricetidae (New World rats and mice)

- Akodon mystax (Caparaó grass mouse) DD^{IUCN} - ICMBio status VU
- Cerradomys goytaca NE - ICMBio status EN
- Euryoryzomys lamia (buffy-sided oryzomys) EN^{IUCN} - ICMBio status EN
- Gyldenstolpia planaltensis NE - ICMBio status EN
- Juscelinomys candango (candango mouse) EX^{IUCN} - ICMBio status CRPEx
- Microakodontomys transitorius (transitional colilargo) EN^{IUCN} - ICMBio status EN
- Noronhomys vespuccii (Vespucci's rodent) EX^{IUCN} - ICMBio status EX
- Oligoryzomys rupestris DD^{IUCN} - ICMBio status EN
- Rhipidomys cariri (Cariri climbing mouse) DD^{IUCN} - ICMBio status VU
- Rhipidomys tribei (yellow-bellied climbing mouse) NE - ICMBio status EN
- Thalpomys cerradensis (Cerrado mouse) LC^{IUCN} - ICMBio status VU
- Thalpomys lasiotis (hairy-eared Cerrado mouse) LC^{IUCN} - ICMBio status EN
- Wilfredomys oenax (greater Wilfred's mouse) EN^{IUCN} - ICMBio status EN

Family Ctenomyidae (tuco-tucos)

- Ctenomys bicolorNE - ICMBio status EN
- Ctenomys flamarioni (Flamarion's tuco-tuco) EN^{IUCN} - ICMBio status VU
- Ctenomys lami (Lami tuco-tuco) VU^{IUCN} - ICMBio status EN
- Ctenomys minutus (tiny tuco-tuco) DD^{IUCN} - ICMBio status VU

Family Echimyidae

- Callistomys pictus (painted tree-rat) EN^{IUCN} - ICMBio status EN
- Phyllomys lundi (Lund's Atlantic tree-rat) EN^{IUCN} - ICMBio status EN
- Phyllomys unicolor (short-furred Atlantic tree-rat) CR^{IUCN} - ICMBio status CR
- Phyllomys brasiliensis (orange-brown Atlantic tree-rat) EN^{IUCN} - ICMBio status EN
- Phyllomys thomasi (giant Atlantic tree-rat) EN^{IUCN} - ICMBio status EN
- Trinomys eliasi (Elias' Atlantic spiny rat) EN^{IUCN} - ICMBio status VU
- Trinomys moojeni (Moojen's Atlantic spiny rat) EN^{IUCN} - ICMBio status EN
- Trinomys mirapitanga (dark-caped Atlantic spiny rat) DD^{IUCN} - ICMBio status EN
- Trinomys yonenagae (Yonenaga's Atlantic spiny rat) EN^{IUCN} - ICMBio status EN

Family Erethizontidae (New World porcupine)

- Chaetomys subspinosus (bristle-spined rat) VU^{IUCN} - ICMBio status VU
- Coendou speratus NE - ICMBio status EN

== See also ==
- List of mammals of Brazil
