= Australocamelus =

Australocamelus Temporal range: Middle Miocene

Scientific classification
- Kingdom: Animalia
- Phylum: Chordata
- Class: Mammalia
- Order: Artiodactyla
- Family: Camelidae
- Tribe: Camelini
- Genus: †Australocamelus; Patton (1969)

Species
- A. orarius

Extinct genus of mammals

Australocamelus is an extinct monospecific genus of camelid, endemic to North America and containing only the species A. orarius.

It lived during the Middle Miocene 16.3—13.6 mya, existing for approximately 2.7 million years.

As of 2026, only a single fossil is assigned to this genus, a left mandibular ramus found near the coast of Texas. It is somewhat similar to but clearly distinct from Priscocamelus, but it is not clear whether these similarities indicate a genuine relationship or simply shared plesiomorphies. A 2026 review concluded that until further remains are found, both of these two genera, rather than their traditional placement with the typical camels of tribe Camelini in the subfamily Camelinae, should be considered incertae sedis within the Camelinae.
