= Erika Hingst-Zaher =

Brazilian biologist

- Scientific career
- Fields: Biology, Natural history, Science communication
- Institutions: Instituto Butantan; Museum of Zoology, University of São Paulo

Erika Hingst-Zaher is a Brazilian biologist, naturalist, and university professor.

Hingst-Zaher studied at the Federal University of Rio de Janeiro alumni where she also fulfilled her PhD. Afterwards she did a post-doc position at the University of São Paulo. She became a researcher at the Instituto Butantan and the Museum of Zoology of the University of São Paulo. She is notable in the scientific community for her efforts in science communication tied to conservation, her coordination of the Instituto Butantan Biological Museum, and for organizing bird-watching and citizen-science events such as Avistar.

Three taxon names are authored by Hingst-Zaher: Cerradomys langguthi, Cerradomys vivoi and Trinomys mirapitanga.
