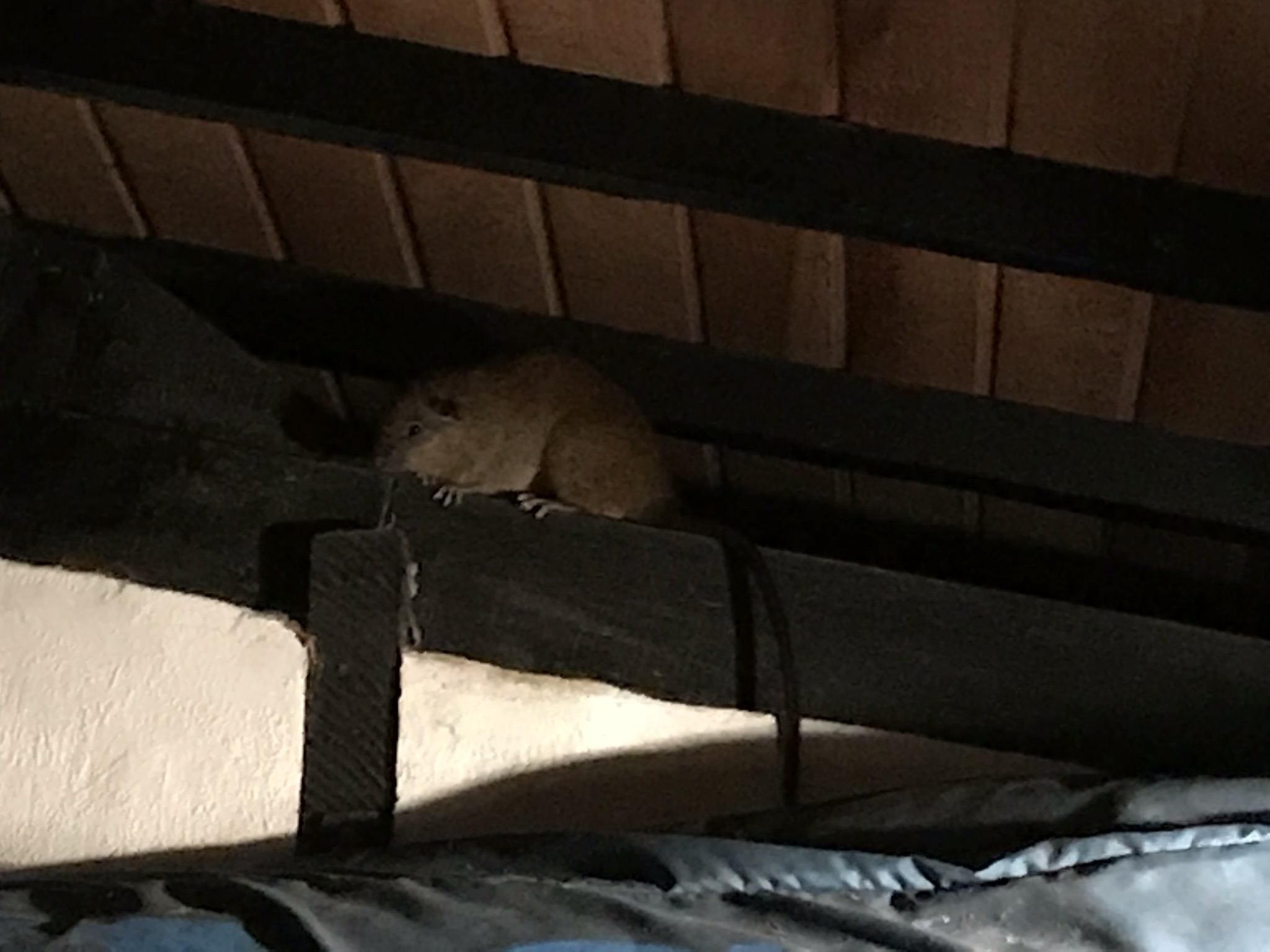
- Giant Atlantic tree-rat (Phyllomys thomasi) at Ilhabela-SP, Brasil

Scientific classification
- Kingdom: Animalia
- Phylum: Chordata
- Class: Mammalia
- Order: Rodentia
- Family: Echimyidae
- Subfamily: Echimyinae
- Tribe: Echimyini
- Genus: Phyllomys; Lund, 1839

Type species
- Nelomys blainvilii Jourdan, 1837

Species
- Phyllomys blainvilii Phyllomys brasiliensis Phyllomys dasythrix Phyllomys kerri Phyllomys lamarum Phyllomys lundi Phyllomys mantiqueirensis Phyllomys medius Phyllomys nigrispinus Phyllomys pattoni Phyllomys sulinus Phyllomys thomasi Phyllomys unicolor
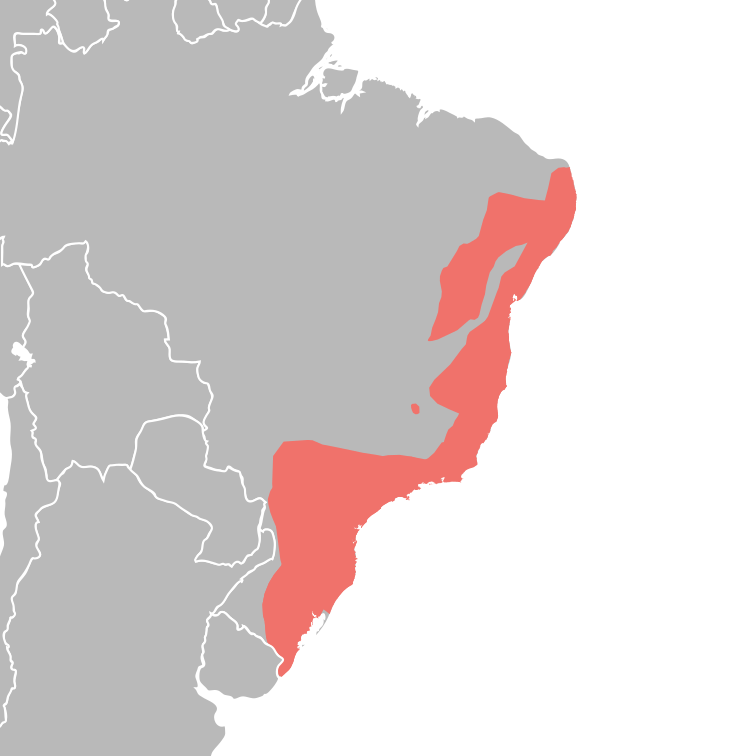
- Phyllomys distribution

Synonyms
- Loncheres Lichtenstein, 1820

= Phyllomys =

Genus of mammals belonging to the spiny rat family of rodents

Phyllomys is a genus of arboreal spiny rat, geographically restricted to the forests of eastern Brazil.

The etymology of the genus name derives from the two ancient greek words φύλλον (phúllon), meaning "plant leaf", and μῦς (mûs), meaning "mouse, rat".

== Phylogeny ==
Phyllomys is the sister genus to Echimys, and then to Makalata. These taxa are closely related to the genera Pattonomys and Toromys. In turn, these five genera share phylogenetic affinities with a clade containing the bamboo rats Dactylomys, Olallamys, Kannabateomys together with Diplomys and Santamartamys.

Genus-level cladogram of the Echimyini.

- Echimyini
  - Isothrix
  - - "Eumysopines"
      - Lonchothrix
        (Tuft-tailed spiny tree-rat)
      - Mesomys
    - - - - Pattonomys
          - Toromys
            (Giant tree-rat)
        - - Makalata
          - - Echimys
            - Phyllomys
      - - - Diplomys
          - Santamartamys
            (Red-crested tree-rat)
        - "Dactylomyines"
          - Kannabateomys
            (Atlantic bamboo rat)
          - - Dactylomys
            - Olallamys

The cladogram has been reconstructed from mitochondrial and nuclear DNA characters.

== Systematics ==
There are thirteen named species in the genus. These species have frequently been placed in the genus Echimys.

- Phyllomys blainvilii – golden Atlantic tree-rat
- Phyllomys brasiliensis – orange-brown Atlantic tree-rat
- Phyllomys dasythrix – drab Atlantic tree-rat
- Phyllomys kerri – Kerr's Atlantic tree-rat
- Phyllomys lamarum – pallid Atlantic tree-rat
- Phyllomys lundi – Lund's Atlantic tree-rat
- Phyllomys mantiqueirensis – Mantiqueira Atlantic tree-rat
- Phyllomys medius – long-furred Atlantic tree-rat
- Phyllomys nigrispinus – black-spined Atlantic tree-rat
- Phyllomys pattoni – rusty-sided Atlantic tree-rat
- Phyllomys sulinus – Southern Atlantic tree-rat
- Phyllomys thomasi – giant Atlantic tree-rat
- Phyllomys unicolor – short-furred Atlantic tree-rat
