= Priscocamelus =

Priscocamelus Temporal range: Early Miocene

Scientific classification
- Kingdom: Animalia
- Phylum: Chordata
- Class: Mammalia
- Order: Artiodactyla
- Family: Camelidae
- Tribe: Camelini
- Genus: †Priscocamelus; Stevens et al. 1969

Species
- P. wilsoni Stevens et al. 1969

Extinct genus of mammals

Priscocamelus is an extinct monospecific genus of camelid, endemic to North America, the only species named as of 2026 being P. wilsoni.

It lived during the Early Miocene 24.8—20.4 mya, existing for approximately 5 million years. Fossils have been found only at two sites in the Rio Grande valley of Texas.

So far, it is only known from fragmentary remains, but among these is a rather well-preserved skull. While it resembles the even less-known Australocamelus, it is not clear whether this indicates a genuine relationship or is simply due to shared plesiomorphies. A 2026 review concluded that until further remains are found, both of these two genera, rather than their traditional placement with the typical camels of tribe Camelini in the subfamily Camelinae, should be considered incertae sedis within the Camelinae.
