= Phyllomys sulinus =

Southern Atlantic tree-rat

Conservation status
- Data Deficient (IUCN 3.1)

Scientific classification
- Kingdom: Animalia
- Phylum: Chordata
- Class: Mammalia
- Order: Rodentia
- Family: Echimyidae
- Genus: Phyllomys
- Species: P. sulinus

Binomial name
- Phyllomys sulinus Leite, Christoff and Fagundes, 2008

Synonyms
- Phyllomys aff. dasythrix

Species of rodent

The southern Atlantic tree-rat (Phyllomys sulinus) is a species of spiny rat from South America, described in 2008. It is found in the subtropical region of southern Brazil, from the states of São Paulo to Rio Grande do Sul.

The etymology of the species name derives from the Portuguese word sul, meaning "south", and pertains to its southern geographic range.
