= Kerr's Atlantic tree-rat =

Kerr's Atlantic Tree-rat

Conservation status
- Data Deficient (IUCN 3.1)

Scientific classification
- Kingdom: Animalia
- Phylum: Chordata
- Class: Mammalia
- Order: Rodentia
- Family: Echimyidae
- Genus: Phyllomys
- Species: P. kerri

Binomial name
- Phyllomys kerri (Moojen, 1950)

Species of rodent

Kerr's Atlantic tree-rat or Moojen's Atlantic tree rat (Phyllomys kerri), is a spiny rat species found in Brazil.
