= Black-spined Atlantic tree-rat =

Conservation status
- Least Concern (IUCN 3.1)

Scientific classification
- Kingdom: Animalia
- Phylum: Chordata
- Class: Mammalia
- Order: Rodentia
- Family: Echimyidae
- Genus: Phyllomys
- Species: P. nigrispinus

Binomial name
- Phyllomys nigrispinus (Wagner, 1842)

Species of rodent

The black-spined Atlantic tree-rat, (Phyllomys nigrispinus), is a South American spiny rat species in the family Echimyidae. It is found in southeastern Brazil, where it inhabits moist broadleaf forest and semideciduous forest in the Atlantic Forest region. It is arboreal and is believed to build nests of leaves in trees. Its karyotype has 2n=52.
