= Golden Atlantic tree-rat =

Conservation status
- Least Concern (IUCN 3.1)

Scientific classification
- Kingdom: Animalia
- Phylum: Chordata
- Class: Mammalia
- Order: Rodentia
- Family: Echimyidae
- Genus: Phyllomys
- Species: P. blainvillii

Binomial name
- Phyllomys blainvillii (Jourdan, 1837)

Synonyms
- Echimys blainvillii (Jourdan, 1837)

Species of rodent

The golden Atlantic tree-rat (Phyllomys blainvillii) is a spiny rat species found in Brazil.
