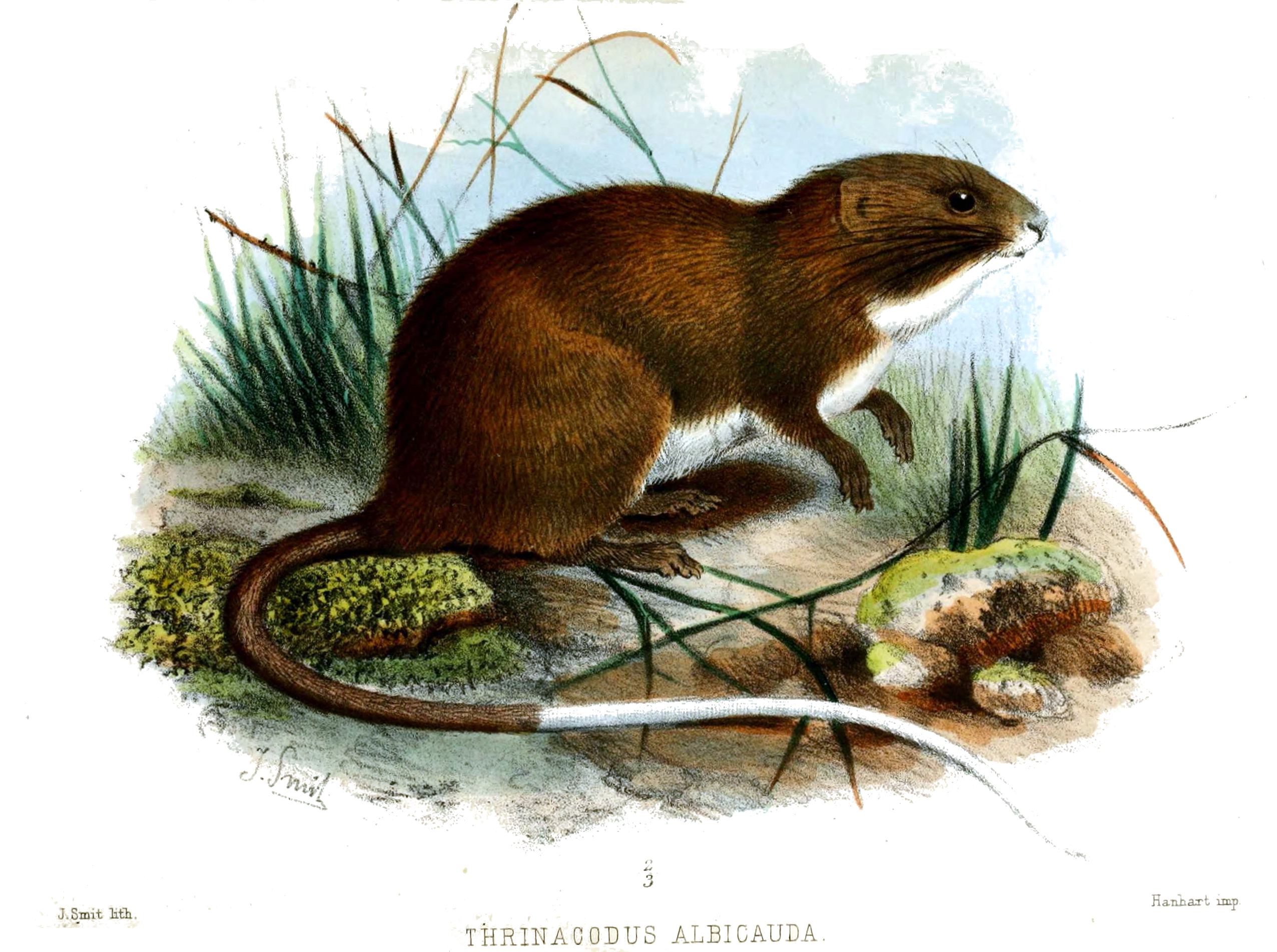

Conservation status
- Data Deficient (IUCN 3.1)

Scientific classification
- Kingdom: Animalia
- Phylum: Chordata
- Class: Mammalia
- Order: Rodentia
- Family: Echimyidae
- Subfamily: Echimyinae
- Tribe: Echimyini
- Genus: Olallamys
- Species: O. albicauda

Binomial name
- Olallamys albicauda (Günther, 1879)
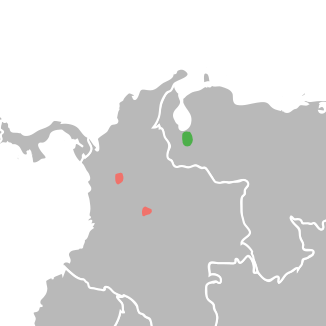
- Olallamys distribution O. albicauda in red

= White-tailed olalla rat =

Species of rodent

The white-tailed olalla rat (Olallamys albicauda) is a species of rodent in the family Echimyidae. It is endemic to Colombia where its natural habitat is subtropical or tropical moist lowland forests.

It is a medium-sized rat with a reddish-brown dorsum, a whitish venter, and a tail characterized by a whitish tip.
