= Antillean cave rat =

Antillean cave rat Temporal range: Quaternary

Conservation status
- Extinct

Scientific classification
- Kingdom: Animalia
- Phylum: Chordata
- Class: Mammalia
- Order: Rodentia
- Family: Echimyidae
- Genus: †Heteropsomys
- Species: †H. antillensis

Binomial name
- †Heteropsomys antillensis Anthony, 1916

Extinct species of rodent

The Antillean cave rat (Heteropsomys antillensis) is an extinct species of spiny rat of the genus Heteropsomys that was native to Puerto Rico.
