= Pallid Atlantic tree-rat =

Conservation status
- Data Deficient (IUCN 3.1)

Scientific classification
- Kingdom: Animalia
- Phylum: Chordata
- Class: Mammalia
- Order: Rodentia
- Family: Echimyidae
- Genus: Phyllomys
- Species: P. lamarum

Binomial name
- Phyllomys lamarum (Thomas, 1916)

Synonyms
- Echimys lamarum

Species of rodent

The pallid Atlantic tree-rat (Phyllomys lamarum) is a species of rodent in the family Echimyidae. It is a species of spiny rat. It is endemic to Brazil, where it is found from Paraíba to Minas Gerais.
