= Bolivian bamboo rat =

Conservation status
- Least Concern (IUCN 3.1)

Scientific classification
- Kingdom: Animalia
- Phylum: Chordata
- Class: Mammalia
- Order: Rodentia
- Family: Echimyidae
- Genus: Dactylomys
- Species: D. boliviensis

Binomial name
- Dactylomys boliviensis Anthony, 1920
- Bolivian bamboo rat range

Species of rodent

The Bolivian bamboo rat (Dactylomys boliviensis) is a species of spiny rat from South America, particularly the southwest Amazon basin. A large, olivaceous rodent, it is nocturnal and feeds almost exclusively on bamboo.

== Description ==
The Bolivian bamboo rat is one of the largest species of spiny rat, with an adult head-body length of about 30 cm (12 in) and a tail 41 cm (16 in) long. It is also unusual in having a hairless tail, soft (rather than spiny) fur, and only four visible toes on the fore-feet.

Most of the body is covered in soft grizzled greyish hair, and marked with blackish streaks. A darker line runs down the centre of the back, while the underparts have only sparse, white fur. The long tail is hairless, except at the base, and covered with large, pentagonal scales. The fifth toe on the forefeet is vestigial, consisting only of a tiny claw located on a tubercle at the side of the foot. The third and fourth toes are widely separated, giving the rat a grasp that has been likened to that of primates. The head has a distinctive blunt nose, and long whiskers. There is also a strong-smelling scent gland just above the sternum.

== Distribution and habitat ==
Bolivian bamboo rats are found in central Bolivia, southeastern Peru, and extreme western Brazil. However, within this range, they are found only in specific habitats, inhabiting dense bamboo thickets between altitudes of 200 and 1,000 m (660 and 3,280 ft), or along densely vegetated riverbanks. There is some overlap in distribution between the Bolivian and Amazon bamboo rat, with the latter occupying lower elevations in the same range, but overlap and competition between the species along headwater habitats have not been well-studied.

== Biology and behaviour ==
Bolivian bamboo rats almost exclusively feed on bamboo, stripping away the outer bark to gnaw at the stems, leaving piles of unconsumed material to the side. They are also known to consume the leaves of bamboo plants, and may also gnaw holes near the internodes of the bamboo plant to gain access to the stems.

They are nocturnal, sleeping through the day in nests of tangled vines located in tree branches 10 to 25 m (33 to 82 ft) above the ground. Population densities can be high, and one individual studied had a home range of just 0.23 hectares (0.57 acres). The rats are agile climbers, and move through heavy vegetation almost silently. When disturbed, the freeze in place, or run swiftly up into trees.

Moving only at night, and then slowly and in areas of dense vegetation, Bolivian bamboo rats can be difficult to observe. However, they do make distinctive calls, which may carry over long distances, and are apparently used to communicate with one another. These calls consist of a series of short, staccato grunts, and have compared to those of toads. The calls are often made while the rats are perched on branches, or after scent marking with their sternal glands. Other nearby individuals often respond with calls of their own.

The Bolivian bamboo rat notably has the highest number of chromosomes out of any known mammal (2n = 118).

== Conservation ==
The Bolivian bamboo rat is a least-concern species as defined by the IUCN Red List of Threatened Species, based on the general diversity of its habitats. However, the species has been little studied, as despite its loud vocalizations it is elusive and difficult to capture alive.
