= Insular cave rat =

Insular cave rat Temporal range: Holocene

Conservation status
- Extinct (IUCN 3.1)

Scientific classification
- Kingdom: Animalia
- Phylum: Chordata
- Class: Mammalia
- Order: Rodentia
- Family: Echimyidae
- Genus: †Heteropsomys
- Species: †H. insulans

Binomial name
- †Heteropsomys insulans Anthony, 1916

Extinct species of rodent

The insular cave rat (Heteropsomys insulans) is an extinct species of spiny rat that was native to Puerto Rico. Known only from recent fossil deposits, it most likely persisted until European colonization of Puerto Rico began.

== Species and description ==
Spiny rats are a group of hystricognath rodents in the family Echimyidae. They are distributed from Central America through much of South America. They were also found in the West Indies until the 1800s. Most species have stiff pointed hairs, or a bristly coat of flat flexible spines that allow for protection. Many echimyids can break off their tails when attacked. This action confuses predators long enough for the animal to escape. Unlike lizards, however, the tail of spiny rats does not regenerate. This technique can obviously be used only once in each individual's lifetime. This species most likely did not do well in conditions of high heat and aridity and are restricted to regions with an abundant source of water.

== Diet ==
These rats were almost exclusively herbivorous. Their diet most likely included fruits, nuts, grass, and sugar cane.
