= Mantiqueira Atlantic tree-rat =

Mantiqueira Atlantic Tree-rat

Conservation status
- Critically Endangered (IUCN 3.1)

Scientific classification
- Kingdom: Animalia
- Phylum: Chordata
- Class: Mammalia
- Order: Rodentia
- Family: Echimyidae
- Genus: Phyllomys
- Species: P. mantiqueirensis

Binomial name
- Phyllomys mantiqueirensis Leite, 2003

Species of rodent

The Mantiqueira Atlantic tree-rat (Phyllomys mantiqueirensis) is a spiny rat species found in Brazil.
