= Long-furred Atlantic tree-rat =

Conservation status
- Least Concern (IUCN 3.1)

Scientific classification
- Kingdom: Animalia
- Phylum: Chordata
- Class: Mammalia
- Order: Rodentia
- Family: Echimyidae
- Genus: Phyllomys
- Species: P. medius

Binomial name
- Phyllomys medius (Thomas, 1909)

Species of rodent

The long-furred Atlantic tree-rat or Thomas's Atlantic tree-rat (Phyllomys medius), is a spiny rat species found in Brazil. In recent years, this species have unveiled itself in different parts of Brazil where researchers and scientists are still closely looking into due to lack of knowledge on this species. The Phyllomys medius is closely related to two other species that have recently been connected to the long furred Atlantic tree rat due to similarities in physical characteristics and DNA. (Yuri et.al., 2008) (Edson et al., 2018)
