= Heteropsomys =

Heteropsomys Temporal range: 2.588–0.0005 Ma

Scientific classification
- Kingdom: Animalia
- Phylum: Chordata
- Class: Mammalia
- Order: Rodentia
- Family: Echimyidae
- Subfamily: †Heteropsomyinae
- Genus: †Heteropsomys; Anthony, 1916

Type species
- Heteropsomys insulans Anthony, 1916

Species
- See text.

Extinct genus of rodents

Heteropsomys is an extinct genus of rodent in the family Echimyidae. It contains the following species:

- Antillean cave rat (Heteropsomys antillensis)
- Insular cave rat (Heteropsomys insulans)
