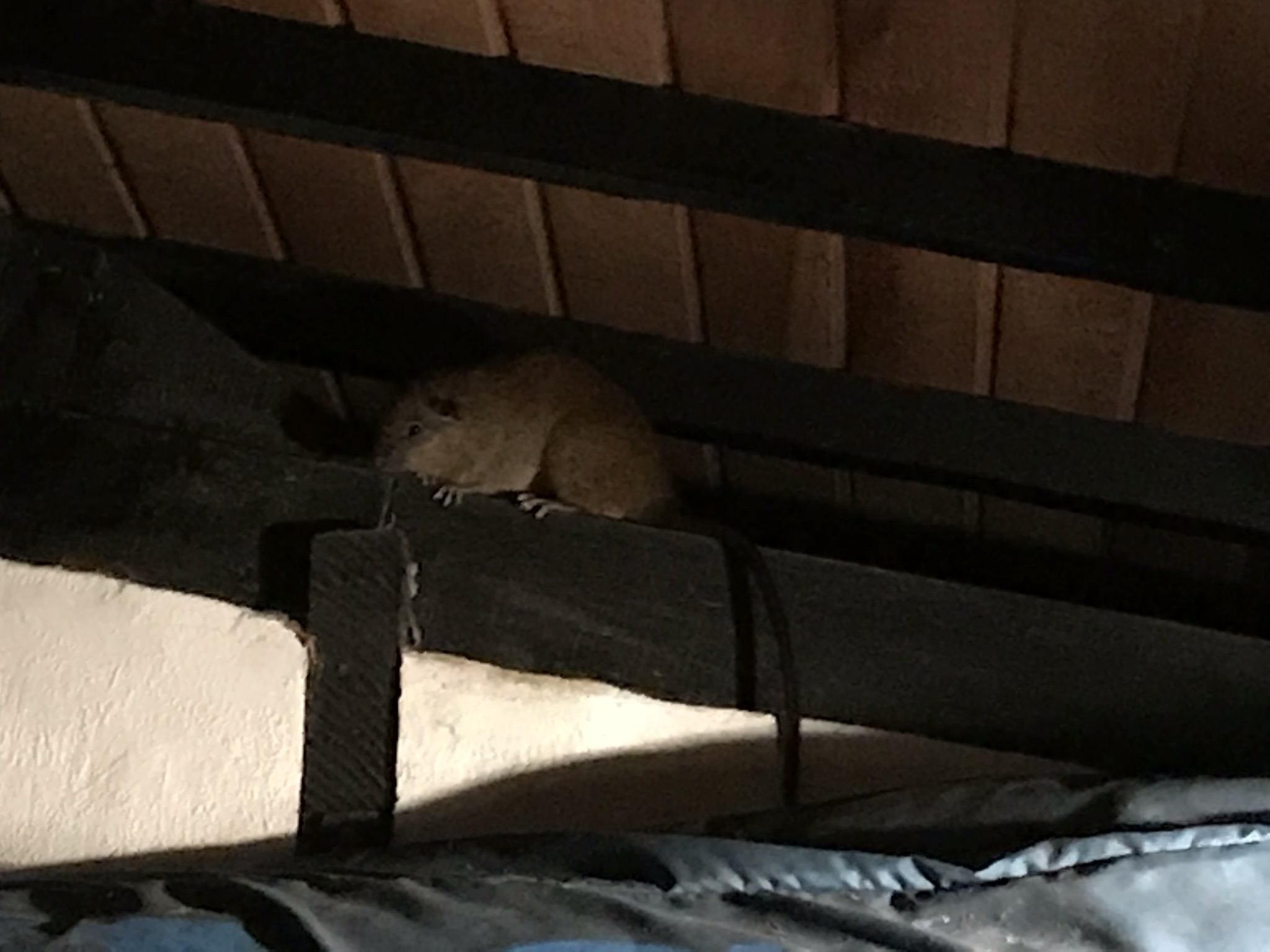

Conservation status
- Endangered (IUCN 3.1)

Scientific classification
- Kingdom: Animalia
- Phylum: Chordata
- Class: Mammalia
- Order: Rodentia
- Family: Echimyidae
- Genus: Phyllomys
- Species: P. thomasi

Binomial name
- Phyllomys thomasi (H. von Ihering, 1897)

= Giant Atlantic tree-rat =

Species of rodent

The giant Atlantic tree-rat (Phyllomys thomasi) is a spiny rat species from Brazil. It is endemic to São Sebastião Island off the coast of São Paulo State. The island is largely protected by the Ilhabela State Park.
