= Lund's Atlantic tree-rat =

Conservation status
- Endangered (IUCN 3.1)

Scientific classification
- Kingdom: Animalia
- Phylum: Chordata
- Class: Mammalia
- Infraclass: Placentalia
- Order: Rodentia
- Family: Echimyidae
- Genus: Phyllomys
- Species: P. lundi

Binomial name
- Phyllomys lundi Leite, 2003

Species of rodent

Lund's Atlantic tree-rat, (Phyllomys lundi), is a spiny rat species found in Brazil.

The Atlantic Tree Rat thrives in a broad-leaf evergreen rain forest with a lush undergrowth. It is best with a secondary forest; a forest that has regrown after an event cleared some of the growth for new growth to start.

== Conservation status ==
Phyllomys lundi is considered endangered by the IUCN's red list. This is because Atlantic Tree Rats are only found in two places in an extremely fragmented forest habitat and its decreasing habitat, due to logging. Not only is the population decreasing, it is also becoming more fragmented. Specific details about the population are unknown.

The Atlantic tree rat is found in the "Reserva Biológica de Poço das Antas" reserve in Rio de Janeiro.
