= Claude Jourdan =

French zoologist

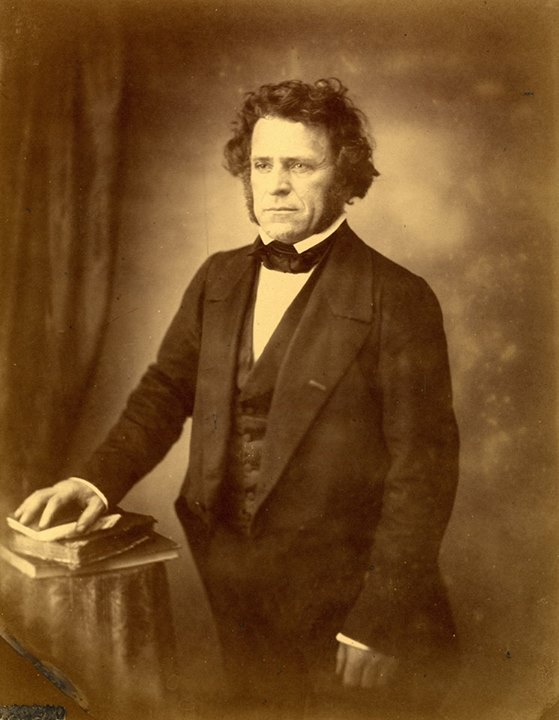
- Born: June 18, 1803
- Died: February 12, 1873 (aged 69)
- Scientific career
- Fields: Zoology paleontology
- Institutions: University of Lyon

Claude Jourdan (18 June 1803, in Heyrieux – 12 February 1873, in Lyon) was a French zoologist and paleontologist.

In Lyon he was a professor of zoology to the Faculté des sciences, and a professor of comparative anatomy at the École des Beaux-Arts. From 1832 to 1869 he was director of the Musée d'histoire naturelle - Guimet in Lyons.

As a zoologist, he conducted studies of living and extinct vertebrates, including Proboscidea (elephants and their ancestors). In 1840–48 he is credited with uncovering 2000 fossils at various excavation sites in France. As a taxonomist, he described Acerodon, a genus of Old World fruit bats, and Hemigalus, a monospecific genus associated with the banded palm civet, Hemigalus derbyanus. He also classified the following mammal species:

- Golden Atlantic tree-rat, Phyllomys blainvilii.
- Western brush wallaby, Macropus irma.

In 1839 Jules Bourcier named the rufous-shafted woodstar, Chaetocercus jourdanii, after him. It is sometimes referred to as "Jourdan's woodstar".

== Published works ==
- Mémoire sur un nouveau genre de Lémurien. 1834.
- Mémoires sur deux mammifères nouveaux de l'Inde, 1837.
- Mémoires sur un rongeur fossile des calcaires d'eau douce du centre de la France, 1837.
- Mémoire sur cinq mammifères nouveaux, 1837.
- Note géologique et paléontologique sur une partie de l'Ardèche.
- Descriptions de restes fossiles de deux grands mammifères des terrains sidérolitiques.
- Description d'ossements de l'Ormenalurus agilis, 1866.
