= James L. Patton =

American geneticist

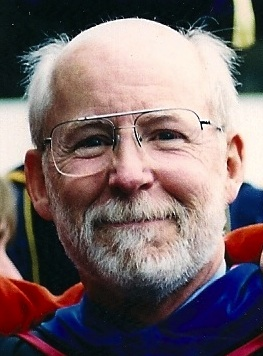
- Patton in 2001
- Born: James Lloyd Patton; June 21, 1941 (age 85); Saint Louis, Missouri
- Citizenship: American
- Education: University of Arizona
- Spouse(s): Carol Porter Patton (m. 1966–present)
- Awards: C. Hart Merriam Award (1983), Distinguished Teaching Award (1991), Joseph Grinnell Award (1998), American Society of Mammalogists Honorary Membership (2001), Berkeley Citation (2001)
- Scientific career
- Fields: Mammalogy, Evolutionary Biology
- Workplaces: Museum of Vertebrate Zoology, UC Berkeley
- Thesis: Chromosome evolution in the pocket mouse, Perognathus goldmani Osgood (1968)
- Doctoral advisor: William B. Heed
- Author abbrev. (zoology): Patton

James Lloyd Patton (June 21, 1941), is an American evolutionary biologist and mammalogist. He is emeritus professor of integrative biology and curator of mammals at the Museum of Vertebrate Zoology, UC Berkeley and has made extensive contributions to the systematics and biogeography of several vertebrate taxa, especially small mammals (rodents, marsupials, and bats).

== Career ==
Patton is best known for his pioneering works on the evolutionary cytogenetics and systematics of rodents, especially pocket mice (Perognathus/Chaetodipus) and pocket gophers (Thomomys), the diversification of rainforest faunas, and the impact of climate change on North American mammals. He has authored nearly 200 scientific publications, many of them in collaboration with 36 graduate students and 13 post-doctoral scholars he mentored over four decades. He is one of the most experienced field mammalogists today, having collected extensively in the western United States and in 14 other countries around the world, including Mexico, Ecuador (Galapagos Islands), Peru, Venezuela, Argentina, Brazil, Colombia, Taiwan, Vietnam, Iran, and Cameroon. As of 2005, he had deposited nearly 20,000 specimens in the Museum of Vertebrate Zoology, making him the most prolific collector of mammal specimens in that institution's nearly 100-year history.

== Honors ==
Patton has several taxa named in his honor: two genera of neotropical rats (Pattonomys and Pattonimus), three species of neotropical rodents (Proechimys pattoni, Phyllomys pattoni, and the fossil Ullumys pattoni), one species of fossil porcupine (Neosteiromys pattoni), one species of neotropical bat (Lonchophylla pattoni), one species of pocket gopher louse (Geomydoecus pattoni), and one species of Madagascar snake (Liophidium pattoni).

The American Society of Mammalogists established the "James L. Patton Award" in 2015 to promote and support museum-based research by graduate students.

== Selected publications ==
- Patton, J. L.; Da Silva, M. N. F.; Malcolm, J. Y. R. (2000). "Mammals of the Rio Juruá and the Evolutionary and Ecological Diversification of Amazonia". Bulletin of the American Museum of Natural History. 244: 1. doi:10.1206/0003-0090(2000)244<0001:MOTRJA>2.0.CO;2. hdl:2246/1593. S2CID 85577629.
- Lacey, E. A.; Patton, J. L.; Cameron, G. N. (1 September 2000). Life Underground: The Biology of Subterranean Rodents. University of Chicago Press. ISBN 978-0-226-46728-3. OCLC 43207081.
- Moritz, C., J.L. Patton, C.J. Schneider, and T.B. Smith. 2000. Diversification of rainforest faunas: An integrated molecular approach. Annu. Rev. Ecol. Syst. 31: 533-563.
- Gascon, C.; Malcolm, J. R.; Patton, J. L.; Da Silva, M. N. F.; Bogart, J. P.; Lougheed, S. C.; Peres, C. A.; Neckel, S.; Boag, P. T. (2000). "Riverine barriers and the geographic distribution of Amazonian species". Proceedings of the National Academy of Sciences. 97 (25): 13672–13677. doi:10.1073/pnas.230136397. PMC 17634. PMID 11095705.
- Patton, J. L. (2001). "Pocket Gophers". In Macdonald, D. W. (ed.). The New Encyclopedia of Mammals. Oxford University Press, Incorporated. ISBN 978-0-19-850823-6. OCLC 59488767.
- Lessa, E. P.; Cook, J. A.; Patton, J. L. (2003). "Genetic footprints of demographic expansion in North America, but not Amazonia, during the Late Quaternary". Proceedings of the National Academy of Sciences. 100 (18): 10331–10334. doi:10.1073/pnas.1730921100. PMC 193561. PMID 12913123.
- Patton, J. L. (2005). "Family Geomyidae". In Wilson, D. E.; Reeder, D. M. (eds.). Mammal Species of the World: A Taxonomic and Geographic Reference (3rd ed.). Johns Hopkins University Press. pp. 859–870. ISBN 978-0-8018-8221-0. OCLC 62265494.
- Patton, J.L. (2005). "Family Heteromyidae". In Wilson, D.E.; Reeder, D.M (eds.). Mammal Species of the World: A Taxonomic and Geographic Reference (3rd ed.). Johns Hopkins University Press. pp. 844–858. ISBN 978-0-8018-8221-0. OCLC 62265494.
- Kelt, D. A.; Lessa, E. P.; Salazar-Bravo, J.; Patton, J. L., eds. (2007). The Quintessential Naturalist: Honoring the Life and Legacy of Oliver P. Pearson. University of California Publications in Zoology. Vol. 134. University of California Press. ISBN 978-0-520-09859-6. OCLC 122715394.
- Patton, J. L.; Huckaby, D. B.; Alvarez-Castañeda, S. T. (2007). The evolutionary history and a systematic revision of the woodrats of the Neotoma lepida group. University of California Publications in Zoology. Vol. 135. University of California Press. pp. i–xx, 1–451. ISBN 978-0-520-09866-4. OCLC 183926621.
- Davis, E. B.; Koo, M. S.; Conroy, C.; Patton, J. L.; Moritz, C. (2008). "The California Hotspots Project: Identifying regions of rapid diversification of mammals". Molecular Ecology. 17 (1): 120–138. doi:10.1111/j.1365-294X.2007.03469.x. PMID 17725571. S2CID 36059418.
- Moritz, C.; Patton, J. L.; Conroy, C. J.; Parra, J. L.; White, G. C.; Beissinger, S. R. (2008). "Impact of a Century of Climate Change on Small-Mammal Communities in Yosemite National Park, USA" (PDF). Science. 322 (5899): 261–264. Bibcode:2008Sci...322..261M. doi:10.1126/science.1163428. PMID 18845755. S2CID 206515224.
- James L. Patton; Douglas A. Kelt (authors) (2019-01-10). Manual of the Mammalia: An Homage To Lawlor's "Handbook to the Orders and Families of Living Mammals". University of Chicago Press, 2018. ISBN 978-0-226-53300-1.
