= Orange-brown Atlantic tree-rat =

Conservation status
- Endangered (IUCN 3.1)

Scientific classification
- Kingdom: Animalia
- Phylum: Chordata
- Class: Mammalia
- Order: Rodentia
- Family: Echimyidae
- Genus: Phyllomys
- Species: P. brasiliensis

Binomial name
- Phyllomys brasiliensis Lund, 1840

Synonyms
- Echimys brasiliensis (Lund, 1840)

Species of rodent

The orange-brown Atlantic tree-rat or red-nosed tree-rat (Phyllomys brasiliensis), is a spiny rat species endemic to Brazil.
