= Dark-caped Atlantic spiny rat =

Dark-caped Atlantic spiny-rat

Conservation status
- Data Deficient (IUCN 3.1)

Scientific classification
- Kingdom: Animalia
- Phylum: Chordata
- Class: Mammalia
- Order: Rodentia
- Family: Echimyidae
- Subfamily: Euryzygomatomyinae
- Genus: Trinomys
- Species: T. mirapitanga

Binomial name
- Trinomys mirapitanga Lara, Patton and Hingst-Zaher, 2002
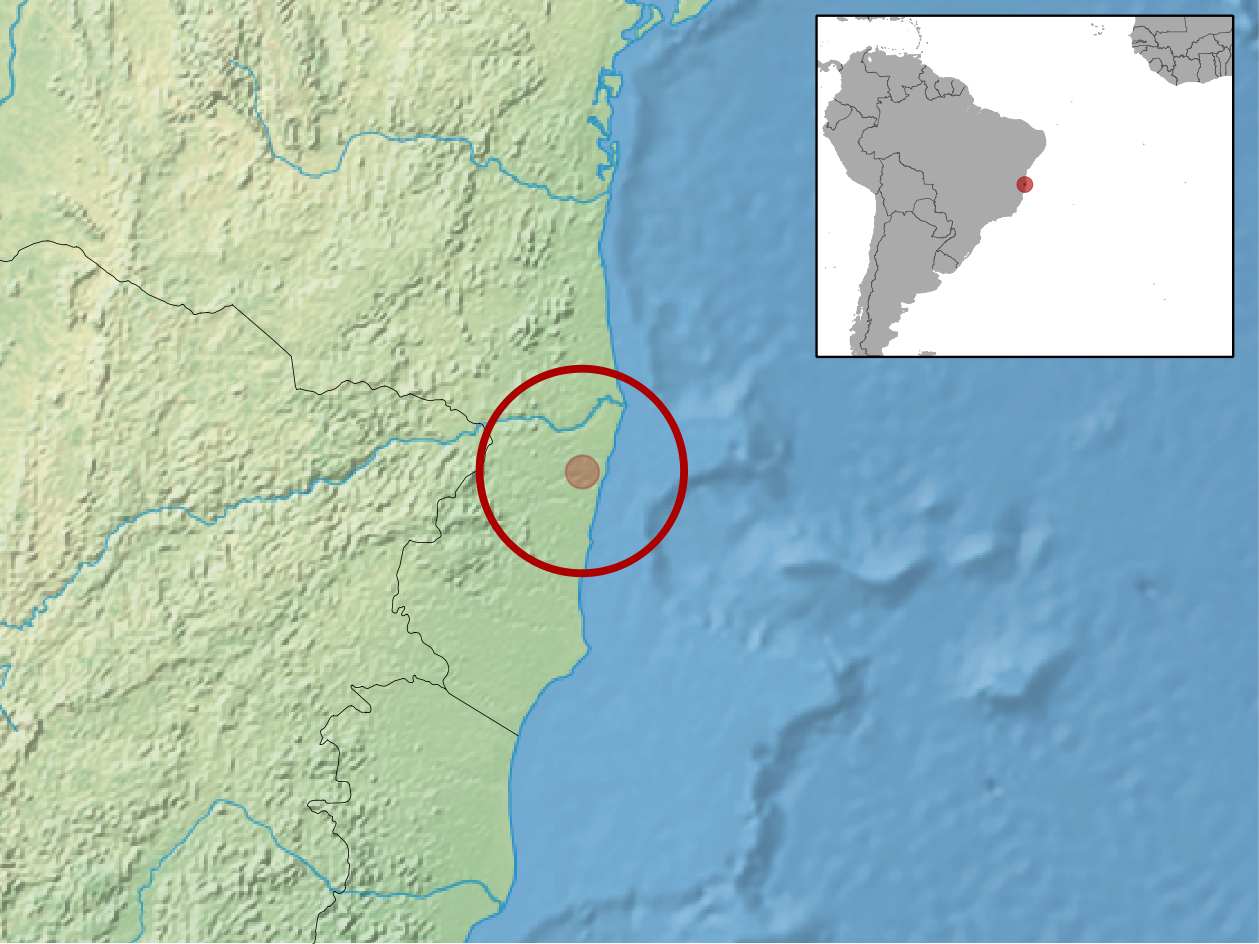

Species of rodent

The dark-caped Atlantic spiny rat or Mirapitanga spiny rat (Trinomys mirapitanga), is a spiny rat species from South America. It is found in Brazil.

Also known as the Pau Brazil Spiny Rat, it is known only from specimens found at two locations on the southern Bahia coast, the Pau-Brasil Ecological Station and the Fazenda São João.
