= Drab Atlantic tree-rat =

Conservation status
- Least Concern (IUCN 3.1)

Scientific classification
- Kingdom: Animalia
- Phylum: Chordata
- Class: Mammalia
- Order: Rodentia
- Family: Echimyidae
- Genus: Phyllomys
- Species: P. dasythrix

Binomial name
- Phyllomys dasythrix Hensel, 1872

Synonyms
- Echimys dasythrix (Hensel, 1872)

Species of rodent

The drab Atlantic tree-rat (Phyllomys dasythrix) is a spiny rat species found in Brazil.
