= Short-furred Atlantic tree-rat =

Conservation status
- Critically Endangered (IUCN 3.1)

Scientific classification
- Kingdom: Animalia
- Phylum: Chordata
- Class: Mammalia
- Order: Rodentia
- Family: Echimyidae
- Genus: Phyllomys
- Species: P. unicolor

Binomial name
- Phyllomys unicolor (Wagner, 1842)

Species of rodent

The short-furred Atlantic tree-rat or Wagner's Atlantic tree rat (Phyllomys unicolor), is a spiny rat species found in Brazil.
