= Rusty-sided Atlantic tree-rat =

Conservation status
- Least Concern (IUCN 3.1)

Scientific classification
- Kingdom: Animalia
- Phylum: Chordata
- Class: Mammalia
- Order: Rodentia
- Family: Echimyidae
- Genus: Phyllomys
- Species: P. pattoni

Binomial name
- Phyllomys pattoni Emmons et al., 2002

Species of rodent

The rusty-sided Atlantic tree-rat (Phyllomys pattoni), is a spiny rat species found in Brazil.
