= White-faced spiny tree-rat =

- In northeastern Brazil

Conservation status
- Least Concern (IUCN 3.1)

Scientific classification
- Kingdom: Animalia
- Phylum: Chordata
- Class: Mammalia
- Order: Rodentia
- Family: Echimyidae
- Genus: Echimys
- Species: E. chrysurus

Binomial name
- Echimys chrysurus (Zimmermann, 1780)
- White-faced spiny tree-rat range

Synonyms
- List: Myoxus chrysurus Zimmermann, 1780; Myoxus chrysourus; Zimmermann, 1783; Hystrix chrysuros; von Schreber, 1783; Myoxus chrysuros; Link, 1785; Glis chrysurus; Treviranus, 1803; Hystrix chrysoura; Goldfuss, 1809; Loncheres paleacea Illiger, 1811; Loncheres chrysura; Illiger, 1815; Echimys cristatus Desmarest, 1817

Species of rodent

The white-faced spiny tree-rat (Echimys chrysurus) is a South American species of rodent in the family Echimyidae. It is restricted to forest and rainforest habitats in Brazil, French Guiana, Guyana and Suriname, living among the branches and feeding on fruit, plants, and insects. The rat's fur is darkest near the back of the head, which also has a distinctive white stripe. Its body is covered in stiff, blunt-tipped guard hairs or spines. Adults weigh up to 760 grams (27 ounces) and are 24 to 33 centimetres (9.4 to 13.0 inches) long, plus a tail that measures about 120% of the head-body length.

The white-faced spiny tree-rat is nocturnal and produces two young in a litter. Its known predators include the ornate hawk-eagle and spectacled owl. First recorded in 1778 and described in 1780, it is a rarely seen species; few studies on the rat's ecology have been performed, and there are not many museum specimens. However, because it is widespread and occurs in several protected areas, it is considered a least-concern species by the International Union for Conservation of Nature, though deforestation is a hazard to its survival.

== Systematics and etymology ==
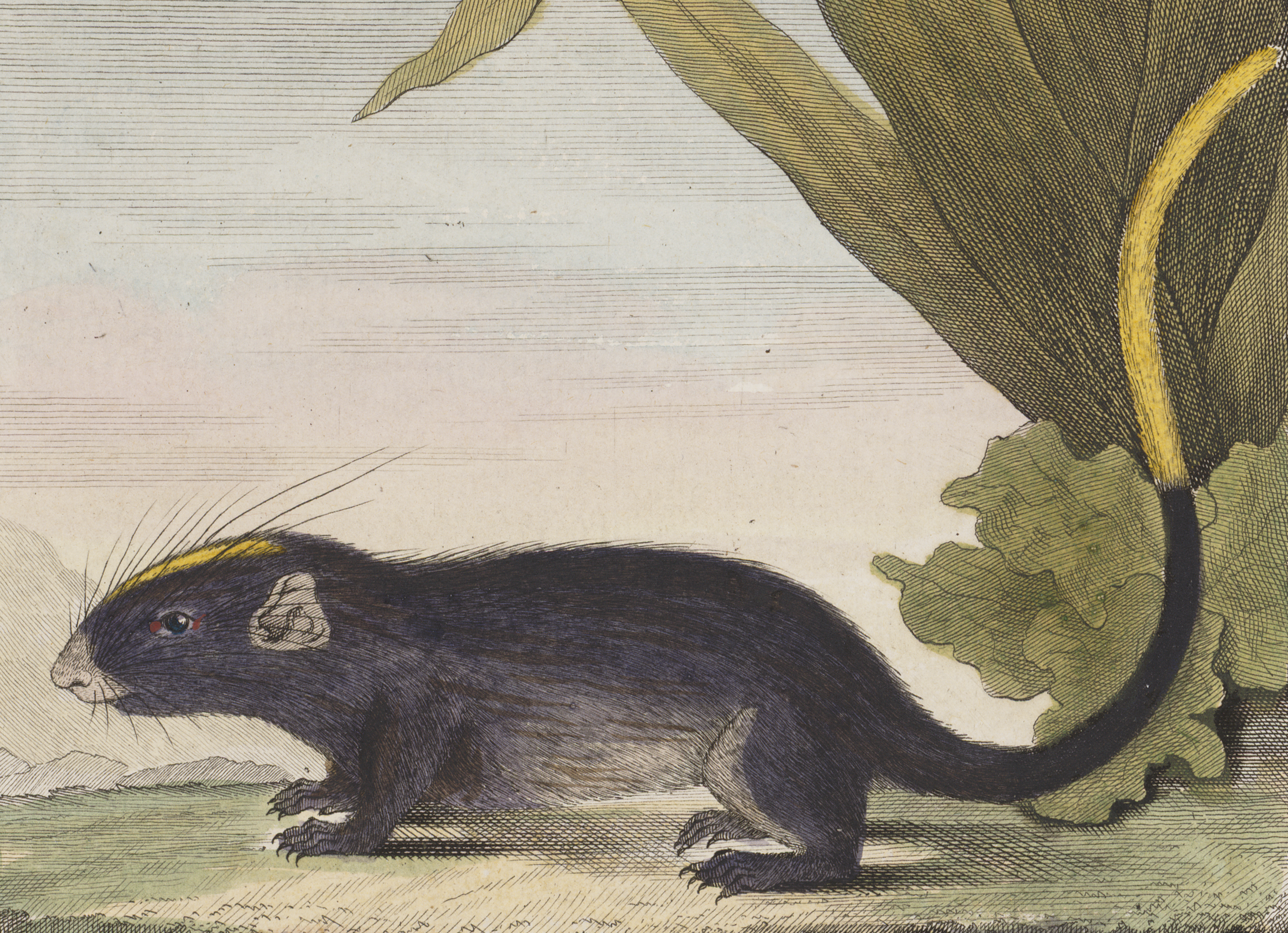
18th-century engraving of the white-faced spiny tree-rat by Dutch draftsman Barent de Bakker, published in the work Histoire Naturelle

The white-faced spiny tree rat was first described by German zoologist Eberhard August Wilhelm von Zimmermann in 1780. He drew upon the Swiss-Dutch natural philosopher Jean-Nicolas-Sébastien Allamand's 1778 addition to the Histoire Naturelle titled "Le Lérot à queue dorée", (Note: "The golden-tailed garden dormouse") a brief article containing a description and 13 measurements. (Note: While Allamand's article first described the species, Zimmermann published his description with a scientific name, making him the species authority.) Zimmermann gave the species the scientific name of Myoxus chrysurus and wrote that its type locality was "Surinam" (at the time a Dutch colony). The original Histoire Naturelle article was based on the type specimen that was sent "without any information regarding either the name by which it is known in its country nor the places where it lives" (Note: French: "sans aucune notice ni du nom qu'on lui donne dans le pays, ni des lieux où il habite") to the private collector Jacob Christoph Klöckner in Amsterdam, who often wrote to Allamand about interesting new specimens. It is unknown what happened to the type specimen, though Klöckner's collection was auctioned off in 1783.

Another species description of the white-faced spiny tree rat was written in 1817 by French zoologist Anselme Gaëtan Desmarest, who noted that the rodent's original description of "golden-tailed" may have stemmed from the solution it was preserved in, as a stuffed specimen used for comparison had no such yellow colour. He gave it the scientific name of Echimys cristatus; this name was later regarded as a synonym of Echimys chrysurus.

The taxonomy of the white-faced spiny tree rat changed often throughout the 18th and 19th centuries. Following its initial placement in Myoxus, (Note: The genus Myoxus later became a synonym of Glis.) it was moved to Hystrix, the Old World porcupines. Later authors assigned it to Glis, Loncheres, and Nelomys before the currently accepted name, Echimys chrysurus, was given by Swiss naturalist Heinrich Rudolf Schinz in his 1825 translation of Le Règne Animal. The rodent is the type species of the genus Echimys, as determined by zoologist George Henry Hamilton Tate in 1935. The genus Echimys was created in 1809 by French naturalist Georges Cuvier to include both Myoxus chrysurus and one "rat épineux" (Note: "spiny mouse") described in 1801, both of which were later clarified as belonging to the same species, E. chrysurus.

This rat has no subspecies. The species Loncheres paleacea (Ignaz von Olfers, 1818) was once thought to represent a distinct species within Echimys and later a subspecies of the white-faced spiny tree-rat, under the trinomial Echimys chrysurus paleaceus, but following reexamination of the type specimen, it was regarded as a synonym of E. chrysurus. According to genetic analysis, the species is closely related to the dark spiny tree-rat (Echimys saturnus). The following phylogenetic tree shows the relationships between the white-faced spiny tree-rat and its closest relatives, excluding Vieira's spiny tree-rat:

- Echimyidae
  - - Toromys, Pattonomys
    - - - - Echimys chrysurus
          - Echimys saturnus
        - - Phyllomys mantiqueirensis
          - - Phyllomys pattoni
            - - Phyllomys dasythrix
              - - Phyllomys blainvilei
                - Phyllomys lundi
      - - Makalata macrura
        - Makalata didelphoides
  - Other members of Echimyidae

The species' binomial name derives from ancient Greek. The species name comes from χρυσός (khrusós), "gold", and οὐρά (ourá), "animal tail". The genus name Echimys, and also its synonym Echinomys, derive from ἐχῖνος (ekhînos), meaning "hedgehog", and μῦς (mûs), meaning "mouse, rat".

== Distribution and habitat ==
The white-faced spiny tree-rat lives throughout Guyana, Suriname, French Guiana, and parts of Brazil. In Brazil, it is known from the eastern Amazon Basin throughout Amapá and parts of Amazonas; east of the Rio Negro in parts north of the Amazon River, and east of the Xingu River south of the Amazon. It is uncertain if this rat is present in parts of Bolívar, Venezuela. Within French Guiana, specimens are rarely identified.

Vine-covered areas of lowland rainforests are the preferred habitat of the white-faced spiny tree-rat. It is a strictly arboreal (tree-dwelling) species; it resides in the middle and upper strata of the rainforest at elevations ranging from sea level up to about 200 metres (660 feet). Though most sightings of the rat have been in tropical evergreen forests, it is known to live in regions where rainforest transitions to deciduous forest as well.

== Description ==
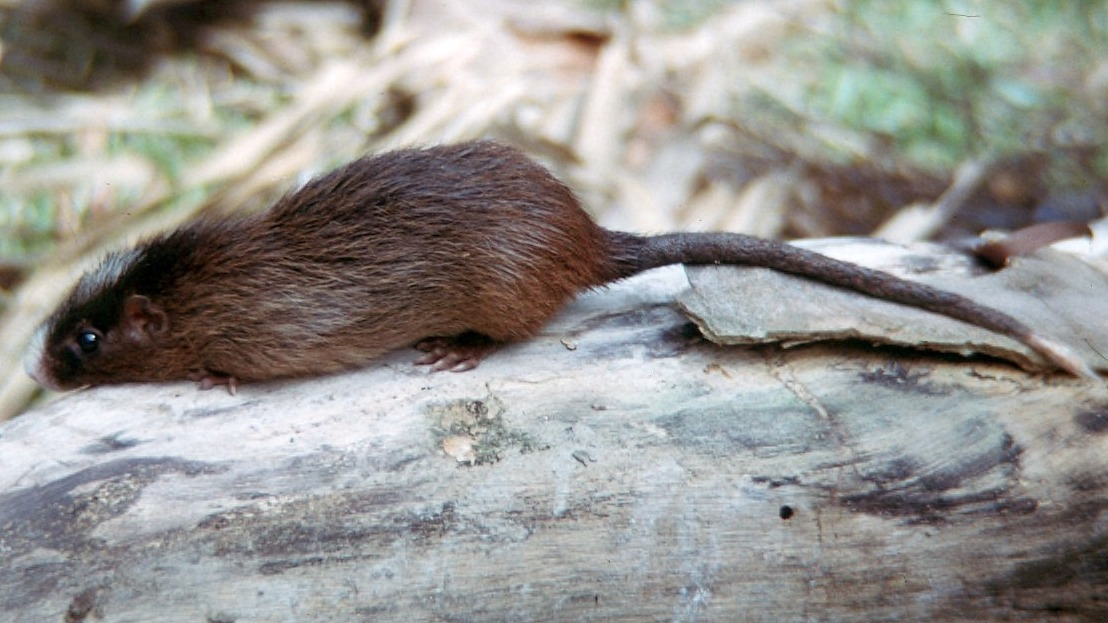
The rodent as seen from the side, its white-tipped tail fully visible

White-faced spiny tree-rats typically weigh up to 760 grams (27 ounces) and have a length of 24 to 33 centimetres (9.4 to 13.0 inches) from the head to the base of the tail. The tail ranges in length from 25 to 40 cm (9.8 to 15.7 in), typically measuring 120% of the rodent's total head and body length, and is covered in hair that turns from brown to white towards the tip.

The rat's fur is made up of a mixture of broad, heavy spines and dark hairs that are brown at the tip and grey along the shaft. The fur near the back of the head is darker than that along the rest of the animal's body. The ears are small, slightly haired, and brown. Its eyes are dark brown and have a red eye shine. The broad feet are covered with brown fur on top, and each digit has a claw. Females have three pairs of developed abdominal mammary glands between the front and hind legs, as well as one pair of small, possibly non-functional mammary glands in the groin region.

Among members of the Echimyidae family, the genus Echimys has some of the most spinose guard hairs or spines, meaning that they are very stiff and robust and have blunt tips. The purpose of these hairs and differences within the family in terms of guard hair softness is thought to be tied to ancestral habitat preference and need for temperature regulation, as softer, denser fur is better at holding on to warmth.

The white-faced spiny tree-rat has several external features that serve as diagnostic character states or traits. The main trait unique to this species is a white stripe on the head that extends from the muzzle back to between the ears. As compared to Vieira's spiny tree-rat and the dark spiny tree-rat, the fur on the back of the white-faced spiny tree-rat is brighter.

The species may also be distinguished from other members of Echimys by several characteristics of its skull: its auditory bullae, bony structures that contain the inner ear, are of medium to small size, the external auditory meatus or ear canal is short, and it has a small internal auditory meatus, a bony canal connecting the inner ear to a cavity at the back of the skull (the posterior cranial fossa). The convex surface of the lower back of the skull, the squamous part of the occiptial bone, has short bony extensions on the lateral sides of the foramen magnum, an opening at the skull's back and lower part (the occiput). Nearby, the depression in the base of the skull known as the jugular fossa is broad and deep. Small, nearly circular openings or fenestrae are present ahead of (anterior to) the ear canals. The septum of the premaxillary bone, at the very tip of the upper jaw, is incompletely separated towards the back. The white-faced spiny tree-rat has parallel, rectangular rows of teeth, and its cheek teeth are longer than they are wide. The species' lower molars are very similar to those in other tree-dwelling spiny rats. However, the alveolar length of the rodent's upper cheek teeth (between 13.3 and 14.5 millimetres (0.52 and 0.57 inches)) has been used as a diagnostic trait, as this length is greater than that of any other member of Echimyidae found in Suriname.

== Behaviour and ecology ==
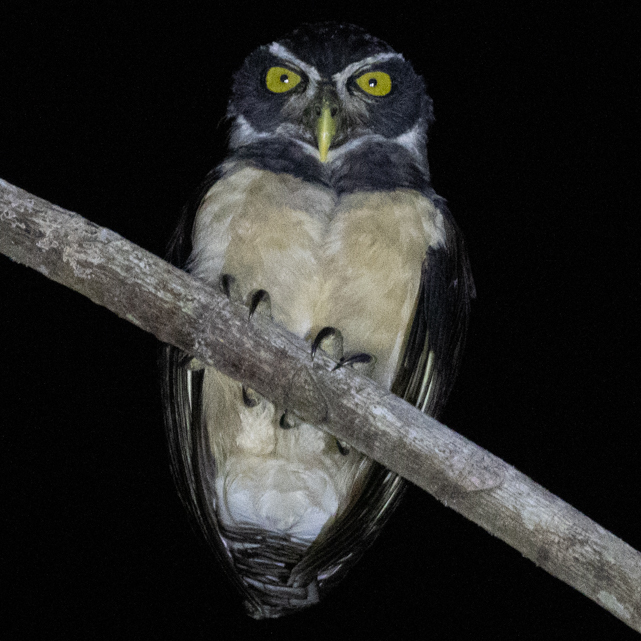
A spectacled owl in Guyana, a predator of the white-faced spiny tree-rat

White-faced spiny tree-rats are nocturnal animals. One female specimen was discovered carrying two embryos, which is a typical number of young per litter for members of the spiny rat family Echimyidae; the young are born already covered in fur and have their eyes open. Members of this rodent family have fairly variable breeding habits, with monogamy giving way to polygyny when population densities allow for enough viable mates to be located in the same area; however, nothing specific has been recorded regarding the white-faced spiny tree-rat's mating behaviour. The species typically has a slow pace of movement, but may move quickly across branches to hide when startled by human or predator activity. When disturbed, it will find quickly shelter under foliage and subsequently remain motionless for minutes. It is known to make nests in tree holes, using leaves as nesting material. The species feeds on fruit, foliage, and some insects, mainly arthropods.

The ornate hawk-eagle and the spectacled owl are known predators of the white-faced spiny tree-rat. Terrestrial mammals within the rodent's range that may prey upon it include ocelots and the common opossum. The white-faced spiny tree-rat is host to several parasites, including several members of the flea genus Polygenis and the sandfly species Bichromomyia flaviscutellata. This sandfly is the main vector for the spread of Leishmania amazonensis, a parasite that causes leishmaniasis, throughout the Brazilian Amazon. Rhodnius paraensis, a species of kissing bug discovered in 1977, also feeds upon the blood of this rodent.

== Conservation ==
The white-faced spiny tree-rat has a stable population trend. It is potentially threatened by deforestation, though the 2016 report produced by Catzeflis and Patton for the International Union for Conservation of Nature (IUCN) did not consider this to be a major issue. They classified the species as least concern due to its wide distribution and presence in several protected areas. It was previously classified as vulnerable in the 1996 issue of the IUCN Red List due to a perceived population decline caused by loss of habitat and threats by introduced species in Brazil. Few museum specimens and ecological studies of the species exist, and it has generally been thought of as a rare species, being infrequently mentioned in literature.
