= Zoo Veldhoven =

Zoo in Veldhoven, Netherlands

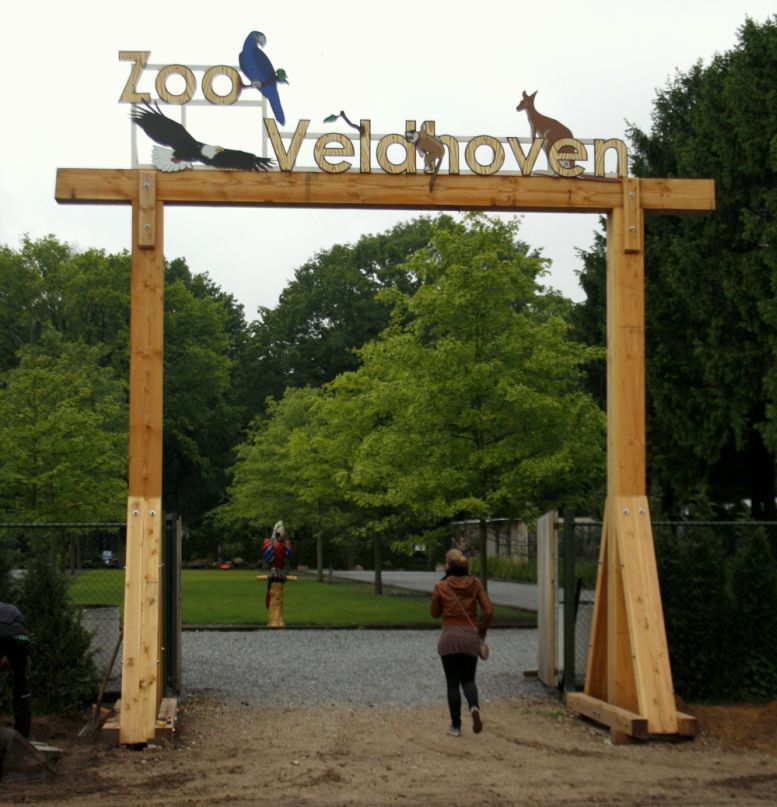
- The entry of Zoo Veldhoven
- Interactive map of Zoo Veldhoven
- 51.425945°N 5.353584°E
- Date opened: 19 April 2014
- Location: Veldhoven, Netherlands
- Land area: 42 acres (17 ha)
- Website: www.zooveldhoven.nl

Zoo Veldhoven is a zoo in Veldhoven. Visitors can feed many animals themselves and the park can also be visited under the guidance of a guide.

== Animals ==
The park is mainly specialized in birds, especially birds of prey, cranes, owls and exotic birds, such as parrots, toucans and rhino birds. In addition, it has a large number of other animal species, such as nasal bears, ringtail sprouts, black whites, and reptiles.

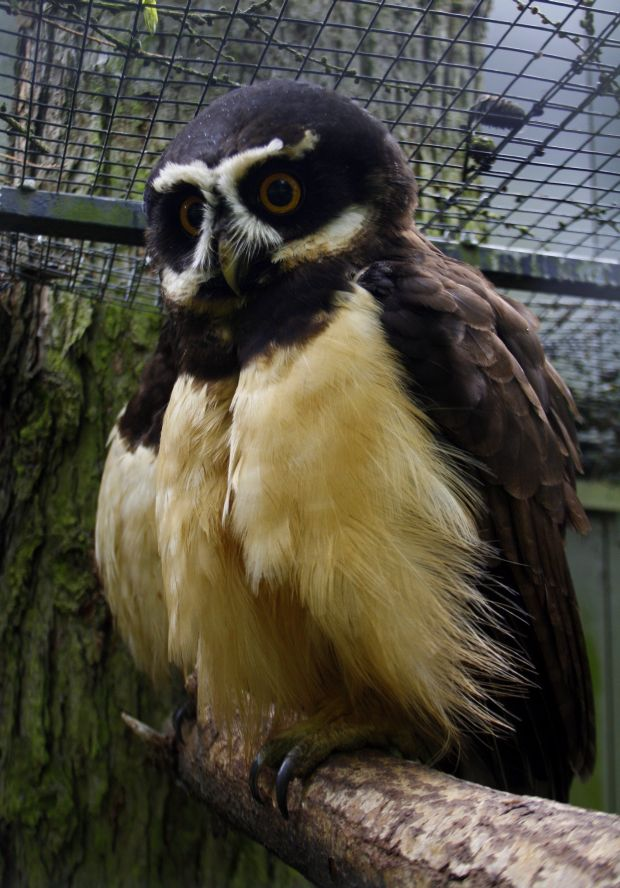
Spectacled owl (Pulsatrix perspicillata)

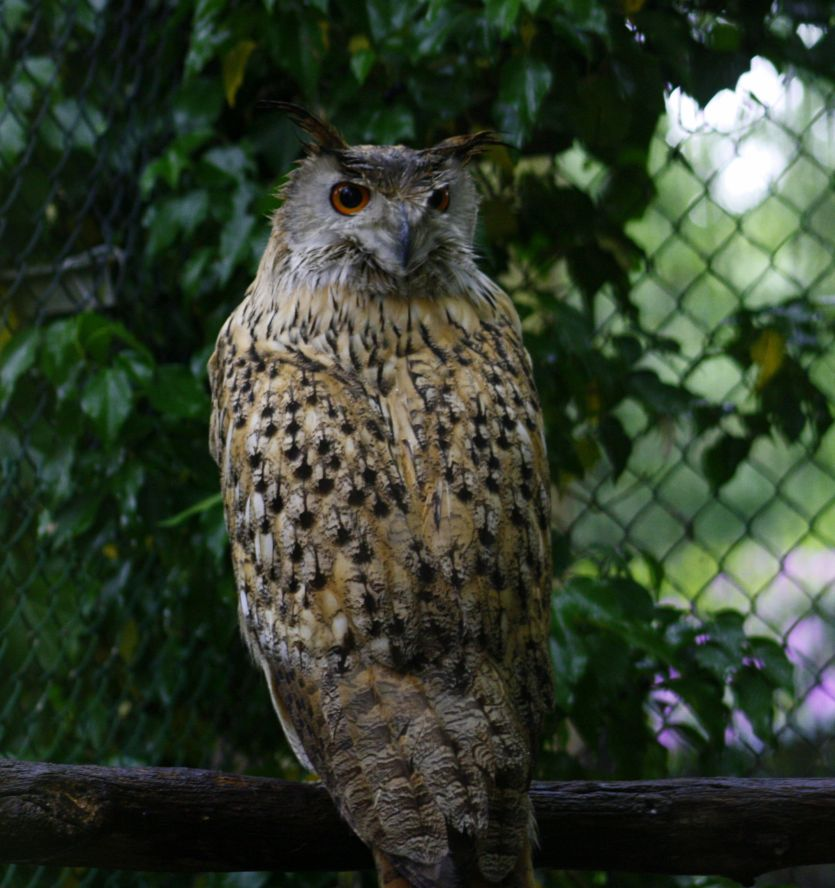
Siberian eagle-owl (Bubo bubo sybericus)

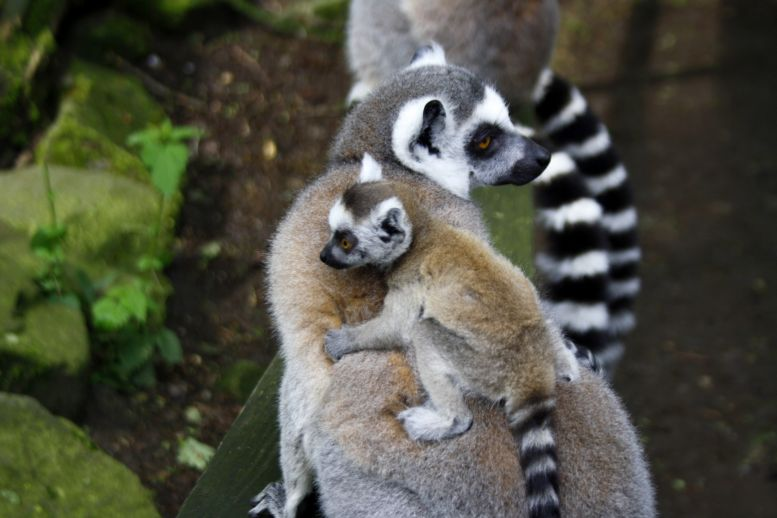
Ring-tailed lemur (Lemur catta)

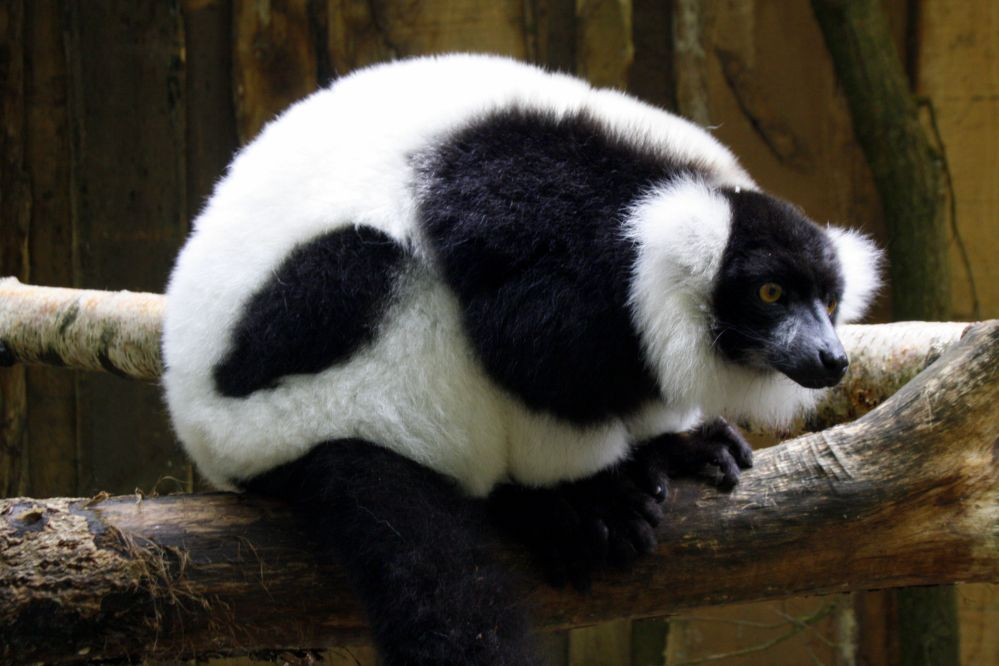
Black-and-white ruffed lemur (Varecia variegata)

== History ==
The park started in 1992 as an initiative of the 'Stichting Nederlands Opvangcentrum Papegaaien' (English: 'Foundation of the Dutch Care Center for Parrots'). After receiving a negative interest in the television broadcast of the Dutch television program Radar on January 12, 2009, the number of visitors dropped drastically. This despite the statement by the General Inspectorate that the park fulfilled all animal welfare requirements.

On January 29, 2013, the bankruptcy of the N.O.P. foundation was declared bankrupt. The park was closed and looked forward to a buyer. There were potential buyers, but eventually, it was taken over by a raptor holder of prey in March 2013. On 2 August 2013, he announced that he would put the park in a completely new jacket and open it to public, under a different name and with many new animals. Eventually, on April 19, 2014, the fully renovated park was opened under the name 'Zoo Veldhoven' for public.
