= HawkQuest =

Raptor-oriented environmental education organization

- HawkQuest logo
- Formation: 1986
- Type: NGO
- Purpose: Environmental education
- Founder: Kin Quitugua
- Website: www.hawkquest.org

HawkQuest, founded in 1986 by Kin Quitugua, is an environmental education organization based in Parker, Colorado, which uses participatory lectures including live raptors to help people "understand and appreciate the interaction of wild living things in their natural environment."

HawkQuest has partnered with Xcel Energy to create classroom programs that use the bird cams deployed by the energy company.

== Founder ==
Kin Quitugua, master falconer and founder of HawkQuest, was born in Guam and moved to Colorado with his family when he was young. In college, he met master falconer Rick Cole, who took him on as an apprentice. After becoming a master falconer himself, he founded HawkQuest to teach others about nature with the help of his birds.

== The birds ==
As of 2010, HawkQuest had 28 individual eagles, falcons, owls, and hawks. The 15 species represented are bald eagle, golden eagle, American kestrel, peregrine falcon, prairie falcon, barred owl, burrowing owl, barn owl, great horned owl, spectacled owl, Eurasian eagle-owl, Eastern screech owl, ferruginous hawk, red-tailed hawk, and Harris's hawk. All of these birds are either injured or have been imprinted to humans and would not be able to survive in the wild.

== Programs ==
HawkQuest provides interactive lectures to groups of all ages, bringing the birds to schools, nature centers, and other venues. HawkQuest raptors can be seen at close range at events such as Native American markets, renaissance festivals, educational symposiums, and craft fairs. Their classroom-in-the-wild program takes students outdoors into the birds' natural environment. They will set up opportunities for bird and photo enthusiasts to photograph the raptors in the wild.

In 2007, HawkQuest presented their message to almost 1.5 million people in 555 events.
