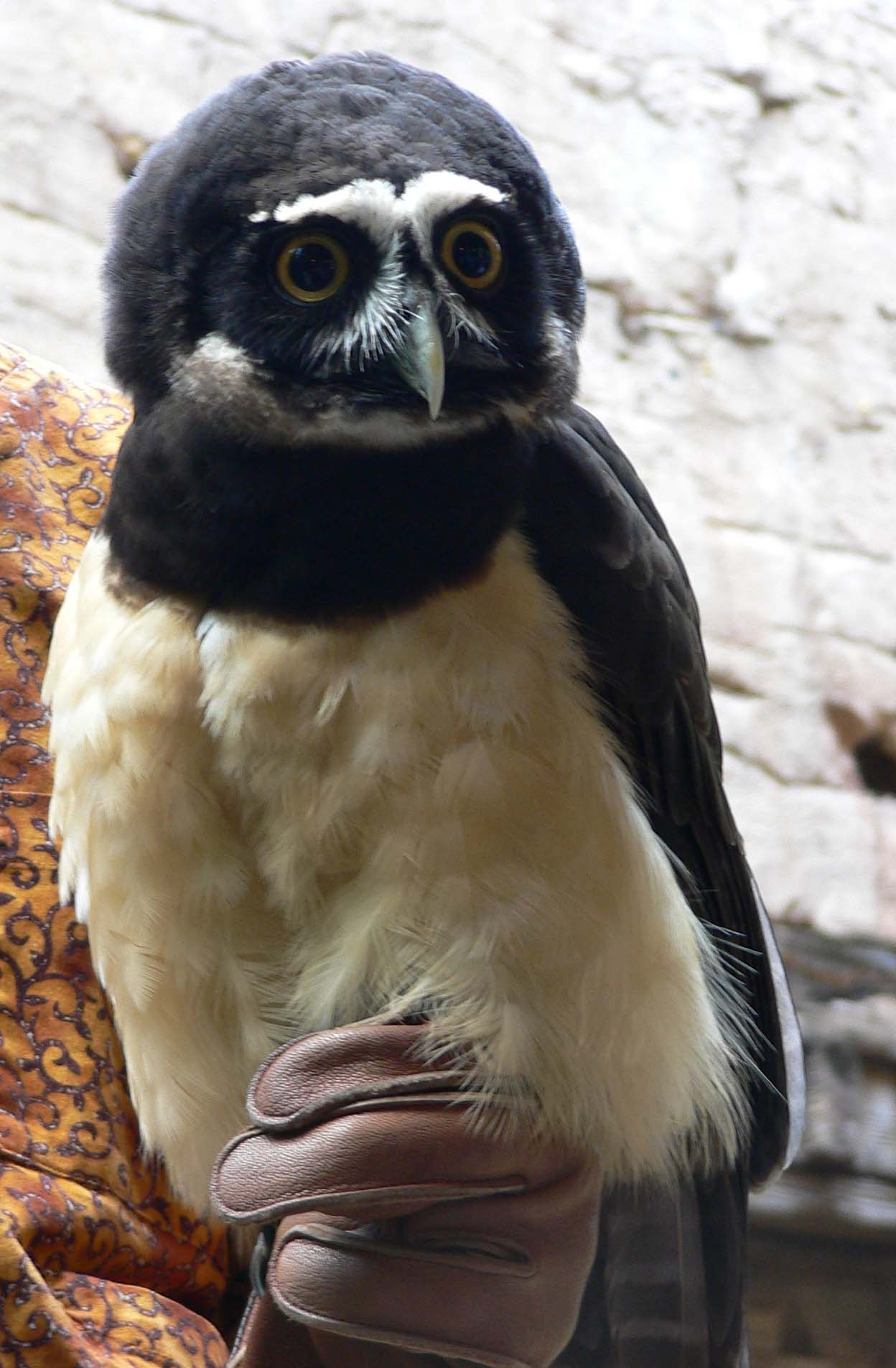
- Pulsatrix perspicillata

Scientific classification
- Kingdom: Animalia
- Phylum: Chordata
- Class: Aves
- Order: Strigiformes
- Family: Strigidae
- Genus: Pulsatrix; Kaup, 1848

Type species
- Strix torquata Daudin, 1800

= Pulsatrix =

Spectacled owls

Genus of birds

Pulsatrix is a genus of owl in the family Strigidae. They are called spectacled owls because of their prominent facial pattern. The genus contains the following species:

Genus Pulsatrix – Kaup, 1848 – three species
Common name	Scientific name and subspecies	Range	Size and ecology	IUCN status and estimated population
Spectacled owl	Pulsatrix perspicillata (Latham, 1790) Six subspecies: Pulsatrix perspicillata boliviana (Kelso, 1933); Pulsatrix perspicillata chapmani (Griscom, 1932); Pulsatrix perspicillata perspicillata (Latham, 1790); Pulsatrix perspicillata pulsatrix (Wied-Neuwied, 1820); Pulsatrix perspicillata saturata (Ridgway, 1914); Pulsatrix perspicillata trinitatis (Bangs & T. E. Penard, 1918)	Mexico, Central America (Belize, Guatemala, El Salvador, Honduras, Nicaragua, Costa Rica, Panama), Trinidad and Tobago, and South America (Colombia, Venezuela, Suriname, French Guiana, Guyana, Paraguay, Ecuador, Peru, Bolivia, Brazil, Argentina).	Size: Habitat: Diet:	LC
Tawny-browed owl	Pulsatrix koeniswaldiana (Bertoni, MS & Bertoni, AW, 1901)	Argentina, Brazil, and Paraguay.	Size: Habitat: Diet:	LC
Band-bellied owl	Pulsatrix melanota (Tschudi, 1844) Two subspecies: P. m. melanota; P. m. philoscia	Bolivia, Colombia, Ecuador and Peru.	Size: Habitat: Diet:	LC

Arredondo's owl (Pulsatrix arredondoi) is a fossil species from the Late Pleistocene of Cueva de Paredones, Cuba.
