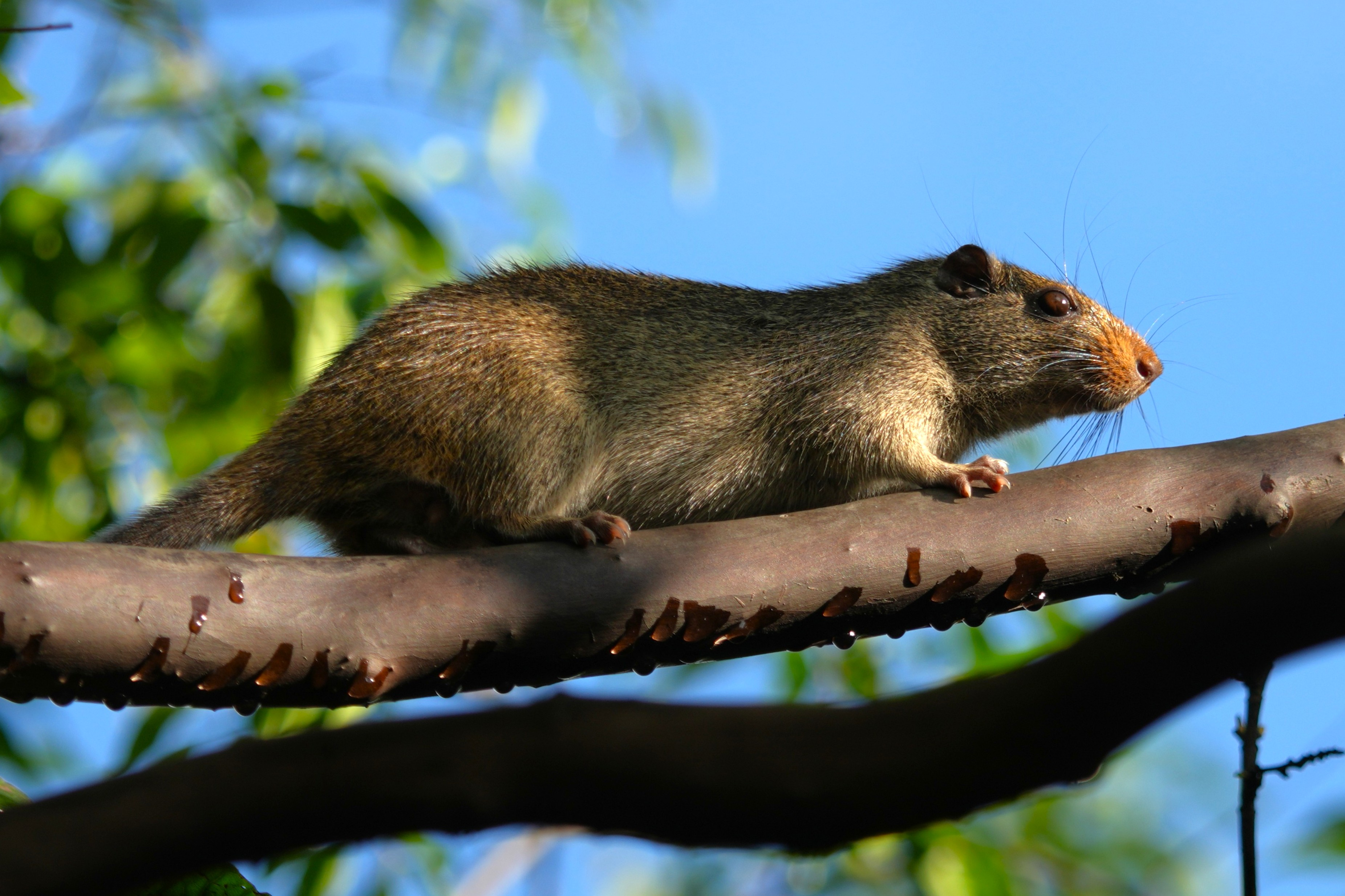
- Makalata rhipidura

Scientific classification
- Kingdom: Animalia
- Phylum: Chordata
- Class: Mammalia
- Infraclass: Placentalia
- Order: Rodentia
- Family: Echimyidae
- Subfamily: Echimyinae
- Tribe: Echimyini
- Genus: Makalata; Husson, 1978

Type species
- Nelomys armatus I. Geoffroy, 1838 (= Echimys didelphoides Desmarest, 1817)

Species
- Makalata didelphoides Makalata macrura Makalata obscura Makalata rhipidura
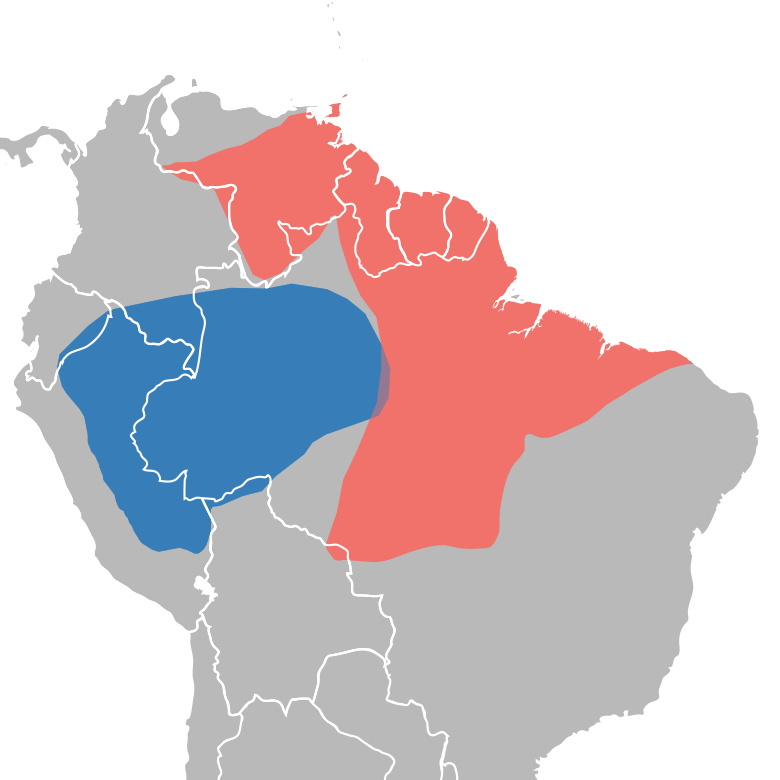
- Makalata distribution M. didelphoides in red, M. macrura in blue, M. obscura distribution unknown

= Makalata =

Genus of mammals belonging to the spiny rat family of rodents

Makalata is a genus of rodents in the family Echimyidae.

== Systematics ==
The etymology of this genus name derives from a combination of letters inspired by the Suriname native name Maka-alata for spiny rats.

This genus contains the following species:

- Brazilian spiny tree-rat (Makalata didelphoides)
- Long-tailed armored tree-rat (Makalata macrura)
- Dusky spiny tree-rat (Makalata obscura)
- Peruvian tree-rat (Makalata rhipidura)

== Phylogeny ==
Makalata is the sister genus to Echimys and Phyllomys. These taxa are closely related to the genera Pattonomys and Toromys, reflecting the fact Pattonomys occasius and Toromys grandis have been placed in Makalata by some authorities. In turn, these five genera share phylogenetic affinities with a clade containing the bamboo rats Dactylomys, Olallamys, Kannabateomys together with Diplomys and Santamartamys.

Genus-level cladogram of the Echimyini.

- Echimyini
  - Isothrix
  - - "Eumysopines"
      - Lonchothrix
        (Tuft-tailed spiny tree-rat)
      - Mesomys
    - - - - Pattonomys
          - Toromys
            (Giant tree-rat)
        - - Makalata
          - - Echimys
            - Phyllomys
      - - - Diplomys
          - Santamartamys
            (Red-crested tree-rat)
        - "Dactylomyines"
          - Kannabateomys
            (Atlantic bamboo rat)
          - - Dactylomys
            - Olallamys

The cladogram has been reconstructed from mitochondrial and nuclear DNA characters.
