= Dusky spiny tree-rat =

Conservation status
- Data Deficient (IUCN 3.1)

Scientific classification
- Kingdom: Animalia
- Phylum: Chordata
- Class: Mammalia
- Infraclass: Placentalia
- Order: Rodentia
- Family: Echimyidae
- Subfamily: Echimyinae
- Tribe: Echimyini
- Genus: Makalata
- Species: M. obscura

Binomial name
- Makalata obscura (Wagner, 1840)

Synonyms
- Mesomys obscurus (Wagner, 1840)

Species of rodent

The dusky spiny tree-rat (Makalata obscura) is a species of rodent in the family Echimyidae that is only known from its original species description. It is endemic to Brazil.

The etymology of the species name corresponds to the Latin word obscurus meaning dark.
