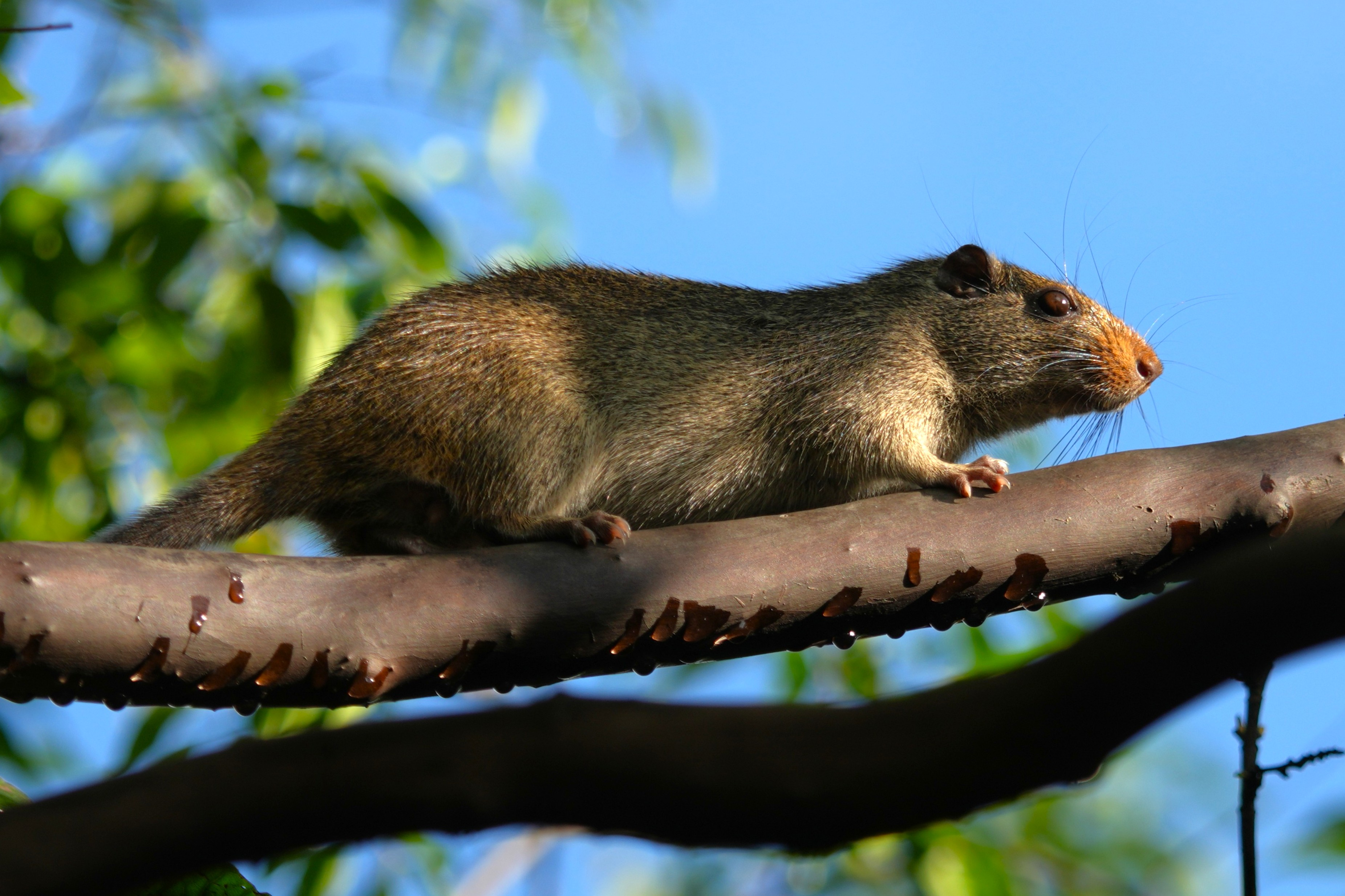

Conservation status
- Data Deficient (IUCN 3.1)

Scientific classification
- Kingdom: Animalia
- Phylum: Chordata
- Class: Mammalia
- Infraclass: Placentalia
- Order: Rodentia
- Family: Echimyidae
- Subfamily: Echimyinae
- Tribe: Echimyini
- Genus: Makalata
- Species: M. rhipidura

Binomial name
- Makalata rhipidura (Thomas, 1928)

Synonyms
- Echimys rhipidurus Thomas, 1928 Toromys rhipidurus; (Thomas, 1928)

= Peruvian tree-rat =

Peruvian tree rat

Species of rodent

The Peruvian tree rat (Makalata rhipidura) is a species of rodent in the family Echimyidae. It is found in northeastern Peru and adjacent Ecuador, where it is found in the Amazon rainforest. It is nocturnal and arboreal.

The etymology of the species name derives from the two ancient greek words ῥιπίς, ῥιπίδος (rhipís, rhipídos), meaning "fan", and οὐρά (ourá), meaning "animal tail".
