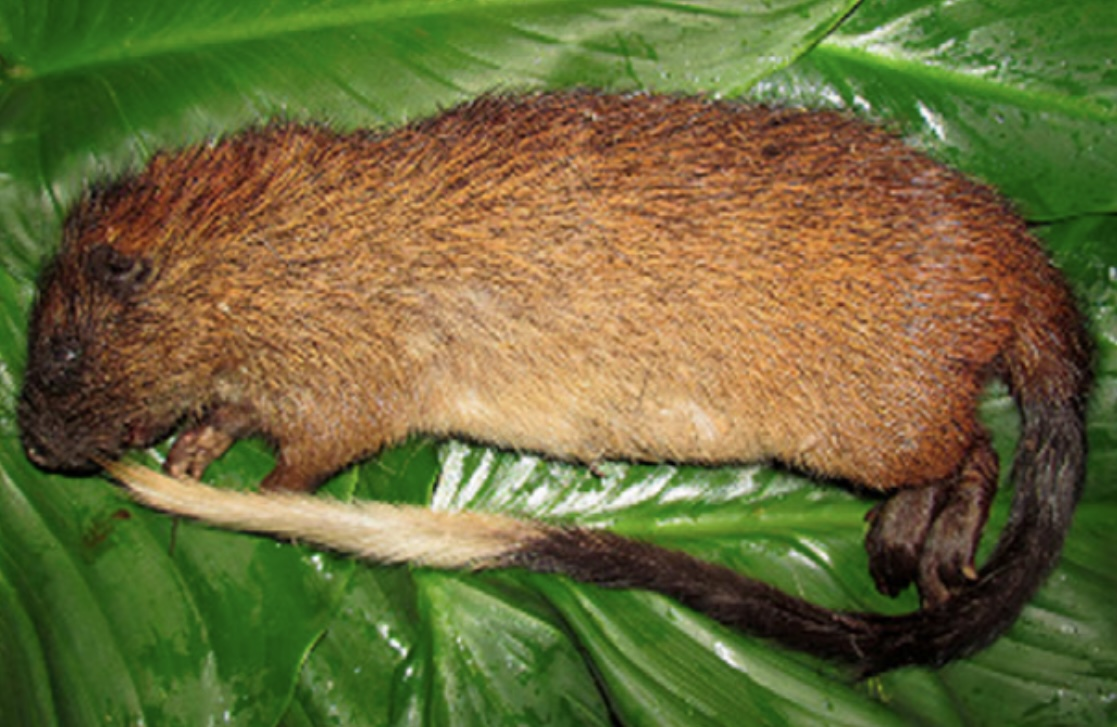

Conservation status
- Data Deficient (IUCN 3.1)

Scientific classification
- Kingdom: Animalia
- Phylum: Chordata
- Class: Mammalia
- Infraclass: Placentalia
- Order: Rodentia
- Family: Echimyidae
- Genus: Echimys
- Species: E. saturnus

Binomial name
- Echimys saturnus Thomas, 1928
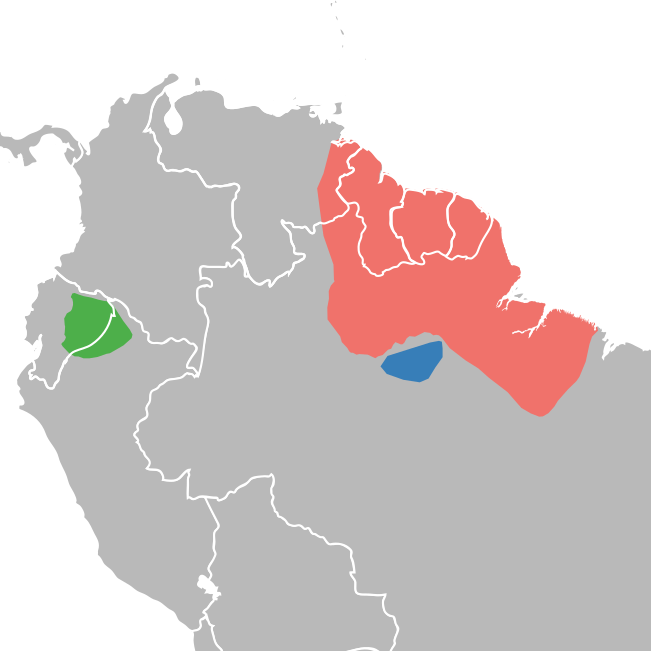
- Echimys distribution E. saturnus in green

= Dark spiny tree-rat =

Species of rodent

The dark spiny tree-rat (Echimys saturnus) is a species of rodent in the family Echimyidae. It is a rarely encountered and nocturnal species, found in eastern Ecuador and central Peru.

Compared to Echimys chrysurus, the main diagnostic character state of this Echimys species is the mostly black dorsal part of the head and body. In addition, E. saturnus can be distinguished from Echimys vieirai by possessing a venter spotted with white while it is uniformly grayish brown in the latter species.

== See also ==
- First records on video of living Echimys saturnus in the Yasuni National Park (Ecuador)
