= Long-tailed armored tree-rat =

Conservation status
- Least Concern (IUCN 3.1)

Scientific classification
- Kingdom: Animalia
- Phylum: Chordata
- Class: Mammalia
- Infraclass: Placentalia
- Order: Rodentia
- Family: Echimyidae
- Subfamily: Echimyinae
- Tribe: Echimyini
- Genus: Makalata
- Species: M. macrura

Binomial name
- Makalata macrura (Wagner, 1842)
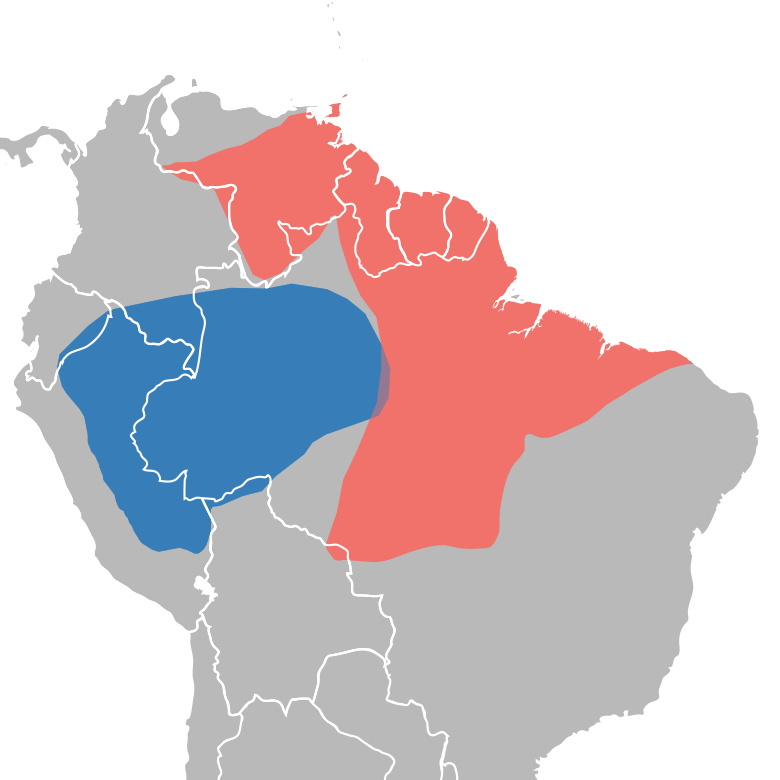
- Makalata distribution M. macrura in blue

Synonyms
- Echimys macrurus Wagner, 1842

Species of rodent

The long-tailed armored tree-rat (Makalata macrura), is a spiny rat species from South America. It is found in Brazil, with a population in Ecuador which is referable either to this species or to Makalata didelphoides. Initially considered a large form of the latter species, it actually represents a distinct species as supported by morphological and molecular characters.

The etymology of the species name derives from the two ancient greek words μακρός (makrós), meaning "long", and οὐρά (ourá), meaning "animal tail".
