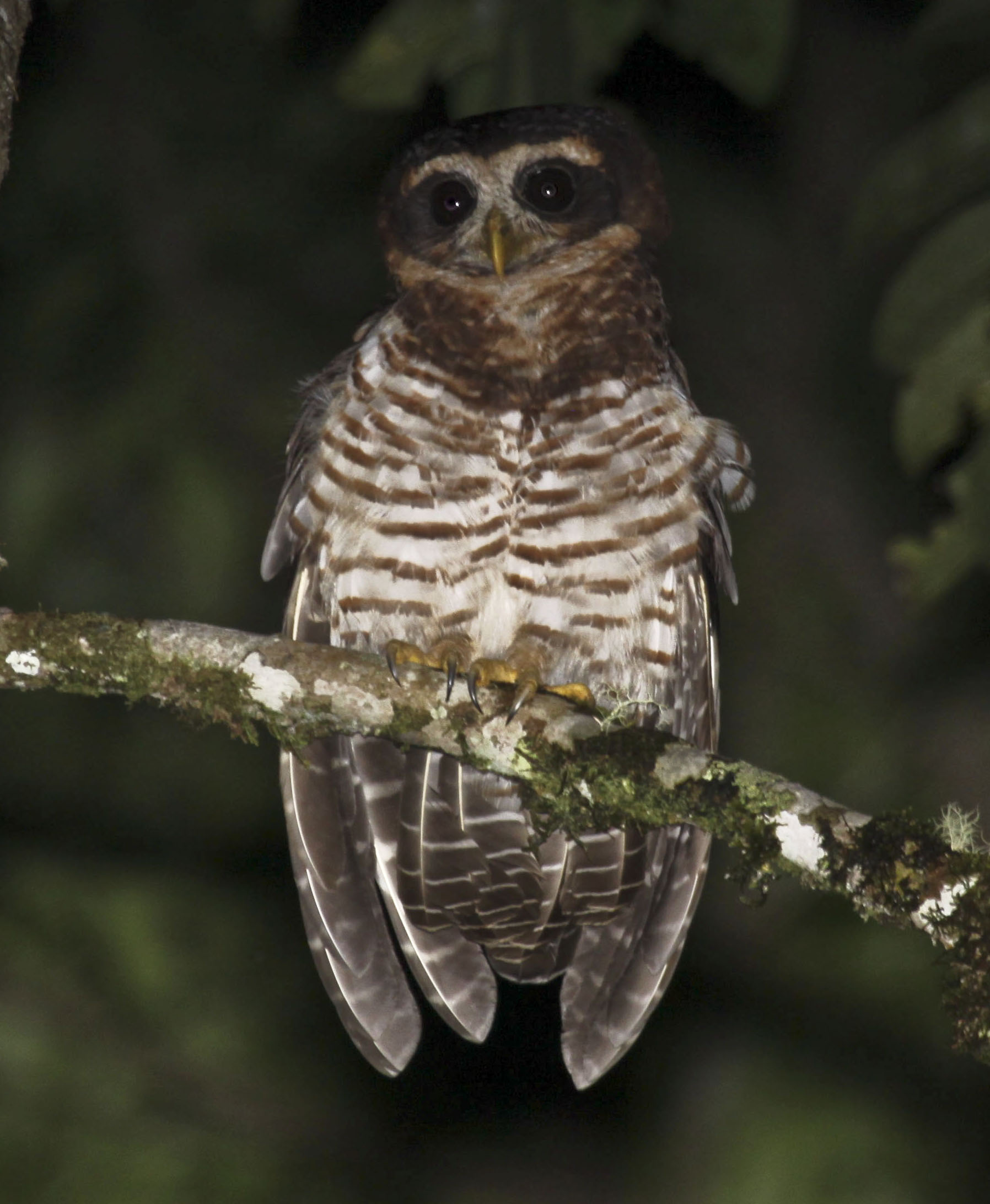

Conservation status
- Least Concern (IUCN 3.1)
- CITES Appendix II

Scientific classification
- Kingdom: Animalia
- Phylum: Chordata
- Class: Aves
- Order: Strigiformes
- Family: Strigidae
- Genus: Pulsatrix
- Species: P. melanota

Binomial name
- Pulsatrix melanota (Tschudi, 1844)

= Band-bellied owl =

Species of owl

The band-bellied owl (Pulsatrix melanota) is a species of owl in the family Strigidae. It is found in Bolivia, Colombia, Ecuador and Peru.

== Taxonomy and systematics ==
The band-bellied owl may form a superspecies with tawny-browed owl (Pulsatrix koeniswaldiana). It has been suggested that they are conspecific but they have different morphology and vocalizations. The band-bellied owl has two subspecies, the nominate P. m. melanota and P. m. philoscia.

== Description ==
The band-bellied owl is fairly large, ranging from 44 to 48 cm (17 to 19 in) long. An analysis of the weight of 13 birds of both sexes showed a range of 590 to 1,250 g (1.30 to 2.76 lb) and an average of 873 g (1.925 lb). The adult has a dark brown facial disk and white "brows" over dark reddish brown eyes. Its upperparts are dark chocolate brown with scattered buffy-white spots. The tail is also dark brown, with thin white bars. The upper breast is reddish brown with buff barring. The rest of the underparts are white to creamy with reddish brown barring. The juvenile's plumage has not been described.

== Distribution and habitat ==
The nominate subspecies of band-bellied owl is found on the eastern slope of the Andes from central Colombia south through Ecuador and Peru. P. m. philoscia is found from there to west-central Bolivia. In elevation it ranges from about 650 to 2,200 m (2,130 to 7,220 ft). It primarily inhabits the interior of humid montane forest and foothills rainforest but is also found on forest edges and in clearings with scattered trees.

== Behavior ==
=== Feeding ===
The band-bellied owl is nocturnal. Its diet is poorly studied but is known to include large insects.

=== Breeding ===
Though there is no published information on the band-bellied owl's breeding phenology, it is presumed to nest in natural tree cavities.

=== Vocalization ===
The band-bellied owl's vocalizations are also poorly known. It is "[s]aid to give a short, deep trill followed by fast burst of popping notes", and "deep, muffled hoots" have been recorded in Peru. The sexes perform duets.

== Status ==
The IUCN has assessed the band-bellied owl as being of Least Concern. However, the species is poorly known and "could be threatened by habitat loss".
