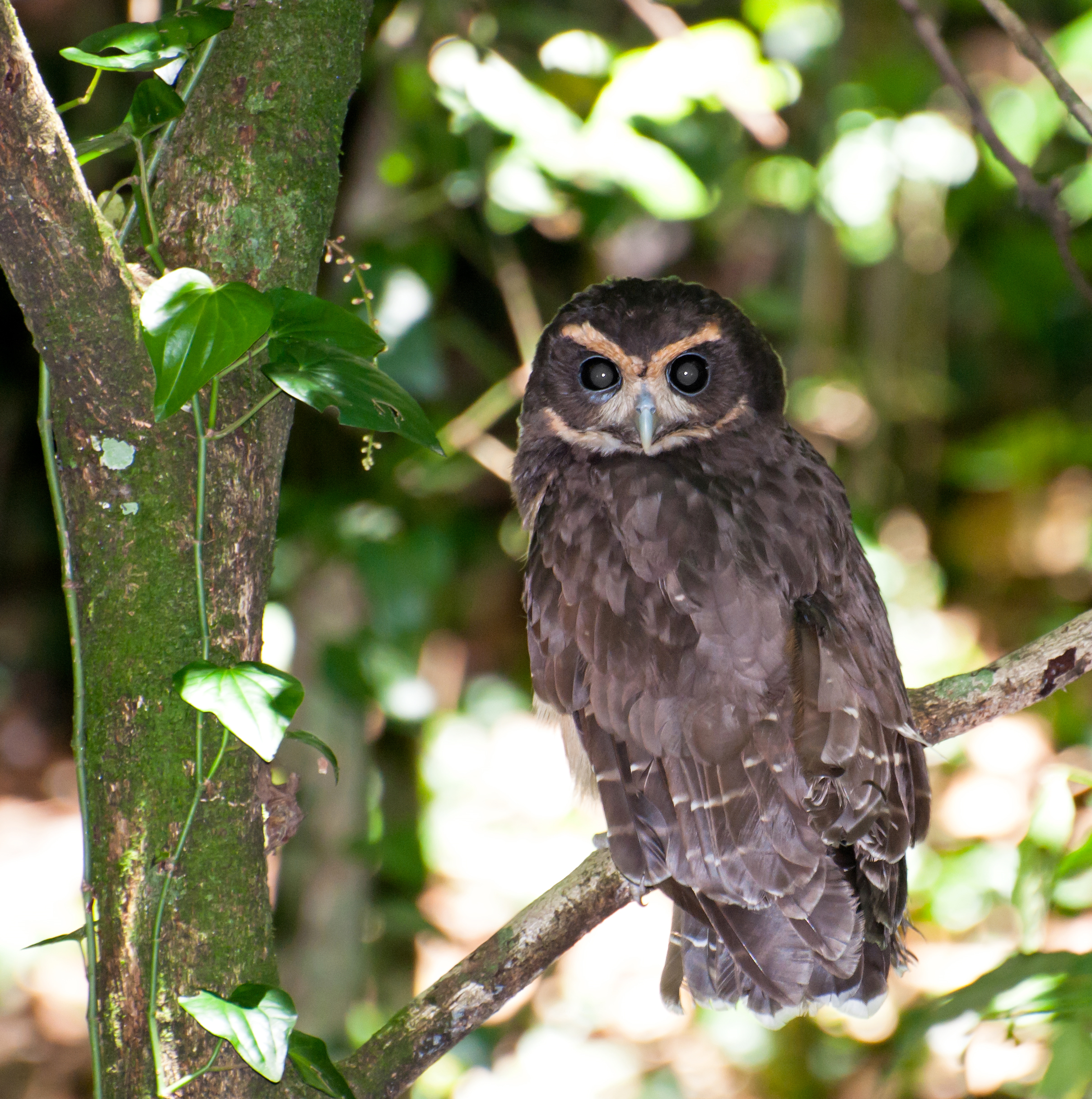
- Adult at Serra da Cantareira state park, São Paulo state, Brazil
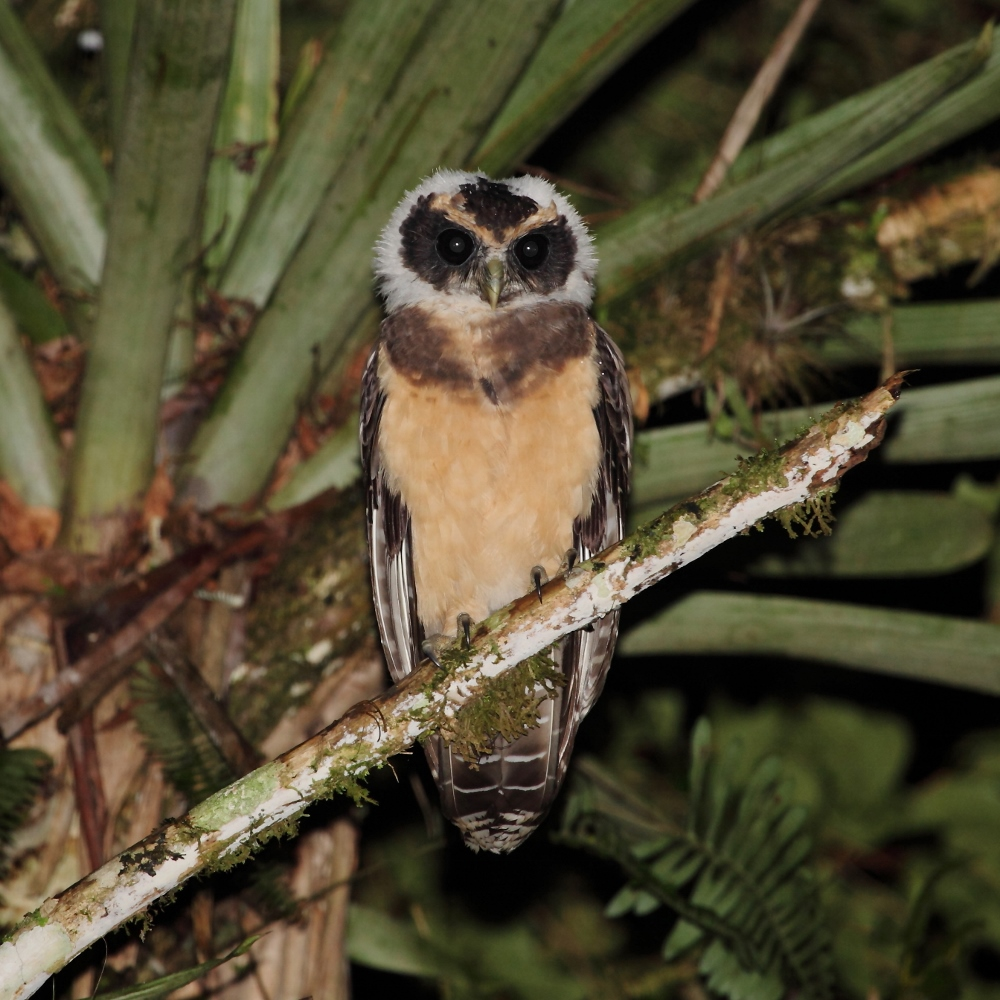
- Subadult at Serra do Mar state park, São Luiz do Paraitinga, São Paulo state, Brazil

Conservation status
- Least Concern (IUCN 3.1)
- CITES Appendix II (CITES)

Scientific classification
- Domain: Eukaryota
- Kingdom: Animalia
- Phylum: Chordata
- Class: Aves
- Order: Strigiformes
- Family: Strigidae
- Genus: Pulsatrix
- Species: P. koeniswaldiana

Binomial name
- Pulsatrix koeniswaldiana (Bertoni, MS & Bertoni, AW, 1901)

= Tawny-browed owl =

Species of owl

The tawny-browed owl (Pulsatrix koeniswaldiana) is a species of owl in the family Strigidae. It is found in Argentina, Brazil, and Paraguay.

== Taxonomy and systematics ==
The tawny-browed owl may form a superspecies with band-bellied owl (P. melanota). It has been suggested that they are conspecific but they have different morphology and vocalizations. It is monotypic.

== Description ==
The tawny-browed owl is about 44 cm (17 in) long. Males weigh 405 to 562 g (14.3 to 19.8 oz) and females 331 to 670 g (11.7 to 23.6 oz). It has a brown facial disk surrounded by ochre, a white chin patch, and creamy "brows" over chestnut-brown eyes. Its breast, upperparts, and tail are dark chocolate brown, and the tail has white bars. The belly is buff and the rest of the underparts are light ochre. The juvenile is initially almost entirely white and gradually attains adult plumage over several years.

== Distribution and habitat ==
The tawny-browed owl is found in Brazil from Espírito Santo state south to northern Rio Grande do Sul and the immediately adjacent areas of eastern Paraguay and northeastern Argentina. It inhabits humid tropical forest, open woodland, and forest dominated by Araucaria evergreens. In elevation it ranges from sea level to about 1,500 m (4,900 ft).

== Behavior ==
=== Feeding ===
The tawny-browed owl is nocturnal. It hunts in the canopy from a perch, taking small mammals, birds, large insects, and probably other small vertebrates.

=== Breeding ===
The tawny-browed owl's breeding phenology has been poorly studied. Its nesting season has not been determined. The clutch size is usually two, laid in a tree cavity, and incubated by the female. Both parents care for fledged young.

=== Vocalization ===
The male tawny-browed owl makes a "[l]ow, descending sequence of guttural, ventriloquial 'brrr brrr brrr brrr' or 'ut ut ut ut ut' notes, accelerating and weaker at [the] end", to which the female responds with a higher pitched call.

== Status ==
The IUCN has assessed the tawny-browed owl as being of Least Concern. Its population size has not been determined, and it is thought to be "relatively rare, or at best uncommon". It occurs in some protected areas, but its Atlantic Forest habitat has been much reduced and fragmented.
