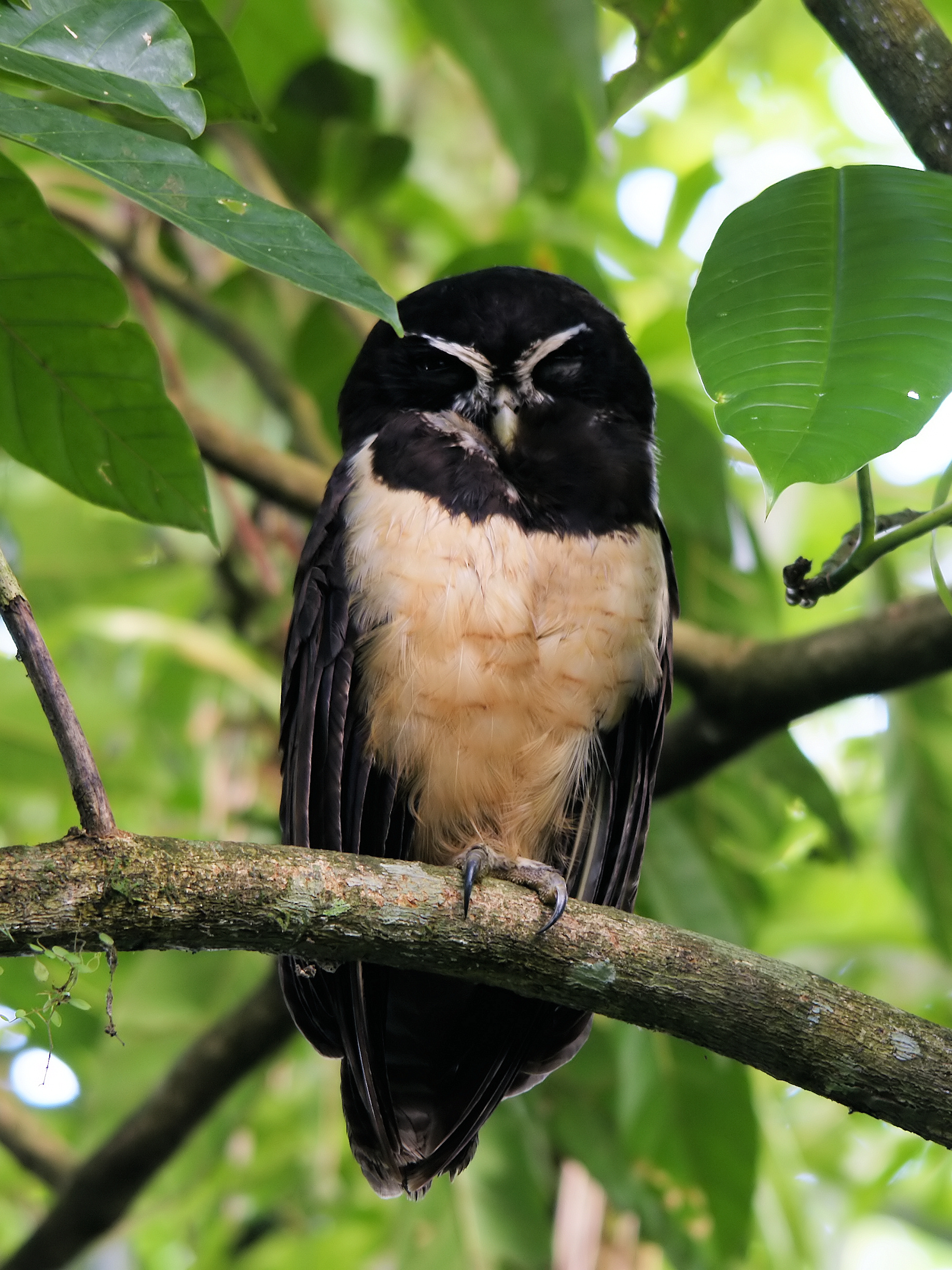
- In the rainforest of Costa Rica

Conservation status
- Least Concern (IUCN 3.1)
- CITES Appendix II

Scientific classification
- Kingdom: Animalia
- Phylum: Chordata
- Class: Aves
- Order: Strigiformes
- Family: Strigidae
- Genus: Pulsatrix
- Species: P. perspicillata

Binomial name
- Pulsatrix perspicillata (Latham, 1790)
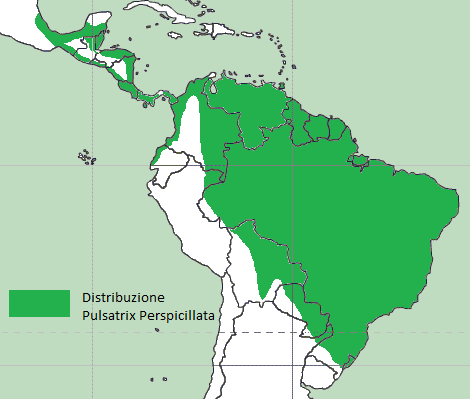
- The distribution of spectacled owl

= Spectacled owl =

Species of owl

The spectacled owl (Pulsatrix perspicillata) also called a Murucututu, is a large tropical owl native to the neotropics. It is a resident breeder in forests from southern Mexico and Trinidad, through Central America, south to southern Brazil, Paraguay, and northwestern Argentina. There are six subspecies. One is occasionally treated as a separate species called the short-browed or brown-spectacled owl but the consensus is that it is still merely a race until more detailed analysis can be done.

== Distribution and habitat ==
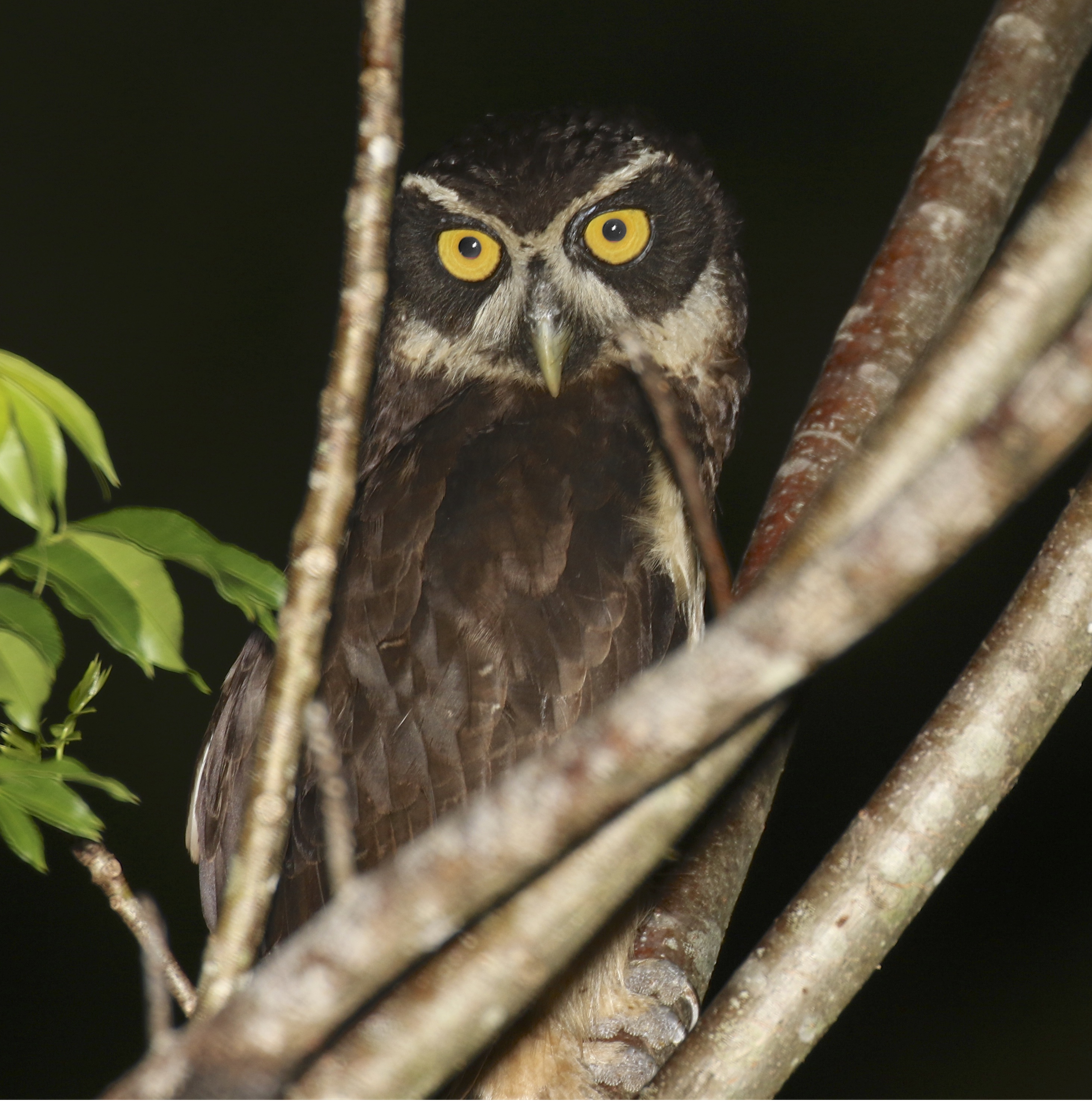
Chan Chich Lodge area, Belize - flash photo

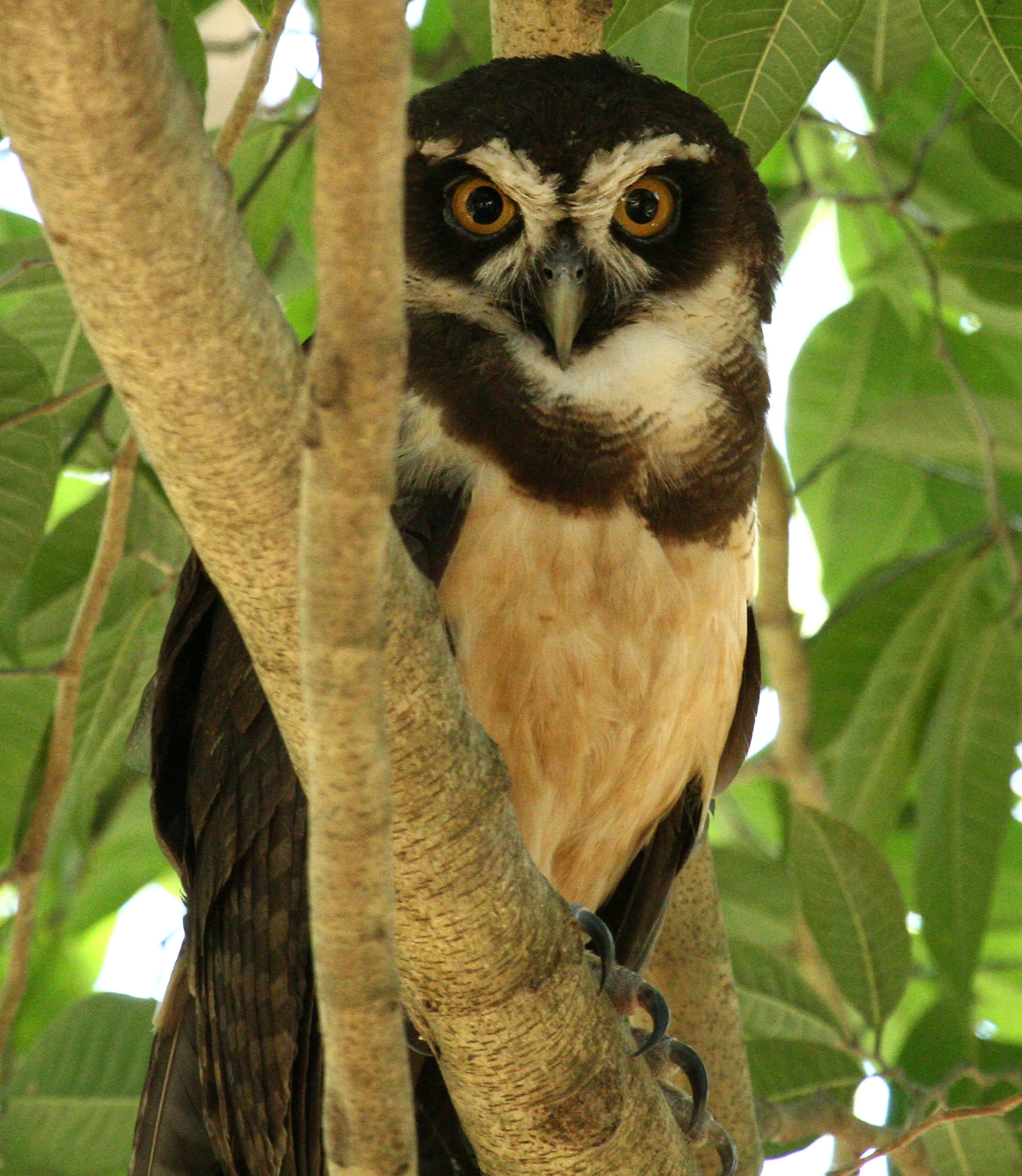
Spectacled Owl, Palo Verde Nat'l. Park, Costa Rica

The spectacled owl is found in Mexico, Central America (Belize, Guatemala, El Salvador, Honduras, Nicaragua, Costa Rica, Panama), Trinidad and Tobago, and South America (Colombia, Venezuela, Suriname, French Guiana, Guyana, Paraguay, Ecuador, Peru, Bolivia, Brazil, Argentina). The spectacled owl is primarily a bird of tropical rainforests, being found mostly in areas where dense, old-growth forest is profuse. However, it may enter secondary habitats, such as forest edges, especially while hunting. On occasion, they have been found in dry forests, treed savanna plains, plantations, and semi-open areas with trees. In areas such as Costa Rica, they may inhabit subtropical montane cloud forests of up to 1,500 m (4,900 ft), although are generally associated with lowland forests.

== Description ==
The spectacled owl can range from 41 to 52.3 cm (16.1 to 20.6 in) in length. Mass in males can range from 453 to 1,075 g (1.00 to 2.37 lb), whereas females can weigh from 680 to 1,250 g (1.50 to 2.76 lb). 10 males from the nominate subspecies (P. p. perspicillata) were found to average 767 g (1.69 lb) while 8 females averaged 908 g (2.00 lb). It is unmistakable in most of its range (except with other Pulsatrix owls) with blackish brown upperparts, head and upper breast, white facial markings, and whitish to yellowish-ochre underparts. The eyes are yellow, the only Pulsatrix with this eye color, and the beak is pale. The juvenile is even more distinctive than the adult, being completely white apart from a chocolate brown facial disc. The head is typically darker than the back and mantle but the shade of this area besides the composition of the breast band is the main distinguishing external feature of the subspecies. Compared to the band-bellied owl (P. melanota), it is of similar or slightly larger size, but that species has dark eyes, white eyebrows, and a brown chest band broken by buffy-whitish barring the rest of broadly the underparts being whitish with reddish-brown barring. The spectacled owl is generally found at lower elevations than the band-bellied but their ranges overlap or abut from Colombia to northern Bolivia. The tawny-browed owl (P. koeniswaldiana), found from northeastern Argentina to eastern Brazil, is fairly similar in appearance to the spectacled but is obviously smaller with ochraceous-tawny from the eyebrows down to the belly and dark chestnut eyes. Each of the three currently recognized species also has a distinct song.

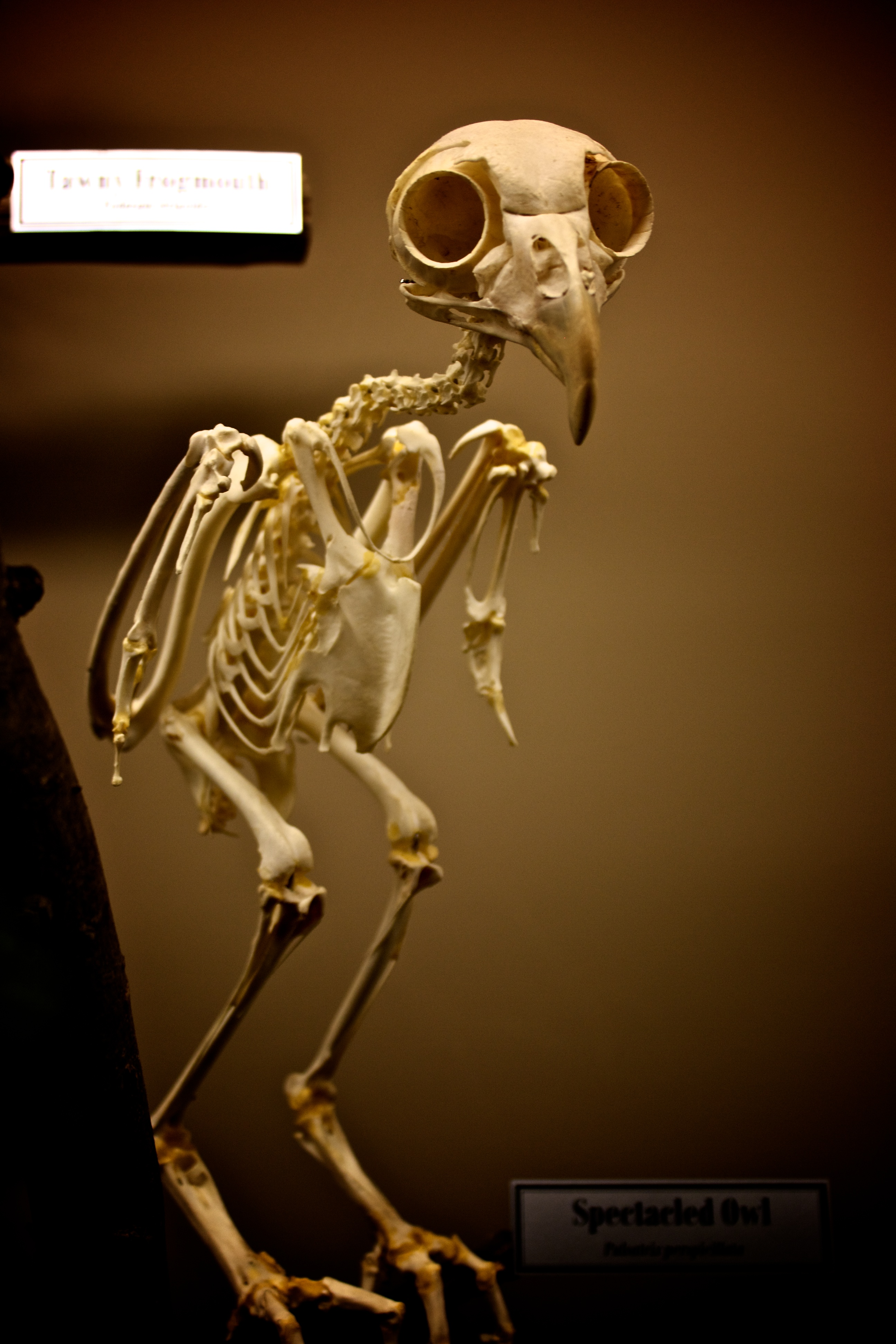
Skeleton

Vocal activity tends to be most prominent on calm, moonlit nights. The primary sound made by the spectacled owl consists of guttural knocking or tapping sounds with a popping effect: PUP-pup-pup-pup-po, POK pok pok bog bog bog bobobo or BOO Boo boo boo boo. Each progressive note becomes weaker and lower in pitch but faster in pace as the call continues. The male is the primary singer to proclaim a territory, often singing from the upper third of a tall tree. However, females also sing, uttering the same song but with a higher pitch. Duets between pairs have been heard on moonlit nights. Females also make a hawk-like scream with an emphasis on the drawn-out second syllable, ker-WHEEER, which has often been compared to a steam whistle. Young spectacled owls beg with a harsh, high-pitched keew call. In Colombia, an author noted that the song is similar to the tapping pattern of the great spotted woodpecker (Dendrocopos major). In Brazil, spectacled owls are known locally as "knocking owls".

== Subspecies ==
Video from Disney's Animal Kingdom

The following subspecies are currently recognized:

- Pulsatrix perspicillata boliviana Kelso, 1933

Distributed in Bolivia. Most similar to P. p. chapmani, with a slightly lighter color on that mantle than that race and a lighter, more buff underside color. The feathers appear to be relatively long on this race especially on the flanks, probably due to the cooler climates it inhabits. Specimens had wings of 335 to 366 mm (13.2 to 14.4 in) and a tail length of 205 mm (8.1 in)

- Pulsatrix perspicillata chapmani Griscom, 1932

Found from eastern Costa Rica to northwestern Ecuador. A relatively dark-hued subspecies, sooty black on the back and rich tawny-rufous below. The wing is 326 to 346 mm (12.8 to 13.6 in), the tail is 183 to 193 mm (7.2 to 7.6 in), and the bill from the cere is 29.5 mm (1.16 in). A mean weight of 750 g (1.65 lb) was published.

- Pulsatrix perspicillata perspicillata (Latham, 1790)

By far the largest distribution of the races, found from northwestern South America to as far south as central Brazil and Bolivia. Nominate as described above. The wing is 305 to 355 mm (12.0 to 14.0 in), the tail is from 133 to 196 mm (5.2 to 7.7 in) long, and the bill from cere is 26.5 to 31.5 mm (1.04 to 1.24 in).

- Pulsatrix perspicillata pulsatrix (Wied-Neuwied, 1820)

Or the "Short-browed Owl"; native to southeastern Brazil from about Bahia south to Rio Grande do Sul in the area of Aparados da Serra National Park and also bordering over into northeastern Argentina. This species has creamy-buff instead of white on the spectacles of the face. P. p. pulsatrix is lighter brown than in any other spectacled owl, with no contrasting darker plumage on the crown and nape as in other races. The breast band is brown and distinctly broken in the center. The main proposed difference (leading to it being considered a full species) is that territorial song is not as accelerated as in other races. Apparently, where the ranges of more typical spectacled owls overlap with the short-browed types, they do not seem to hybridize. This is the largest variety of Spectacled Owl. The wing is 363 to 384 mm (14.3 to 15.1 in) long and the tail is 211 to 226 mm (8.3 to 8.9 in). The weight of a single male and single female was 1,050 g (2.31 lb) and 1,250 g (2.76 lb) respectively, coincidentally exactly the same as the maximum weight recorded for the nominate race of Spectacled Owl.

- Pulsatrix perspicillata saturata Ridgway, 1914

Found from southern Mexico to northern Costa Rica. P. p. saturata differs from the typical spectacled owl only in that it is black on the head and the back, with black barring on the sides. It is one of the more distinct and widely described subspecies. The wing is 314 to 370 mm (12.4 to 14.6 in) and the tail is 182 to 204 mm (7.2 to 8.0 in) long. The bill from the cere is 27 to 32.5 mm (1.06 to 1.28 in). The weight is from 591 to 761 g (1.303 to 1.678 lb) in males and from 765 to 982 g (1.687 to 2.165 lb) in females.

- Pulsatrix perspicillata trinitatis Bangs & T. E. Penard, 1918

Found on Trinidad and Tobago. This poorly-known race is sometimes treated as synonymous with the nominate by some authorities. Today, authorities believe that the race is extinct.

== Behaviour ==
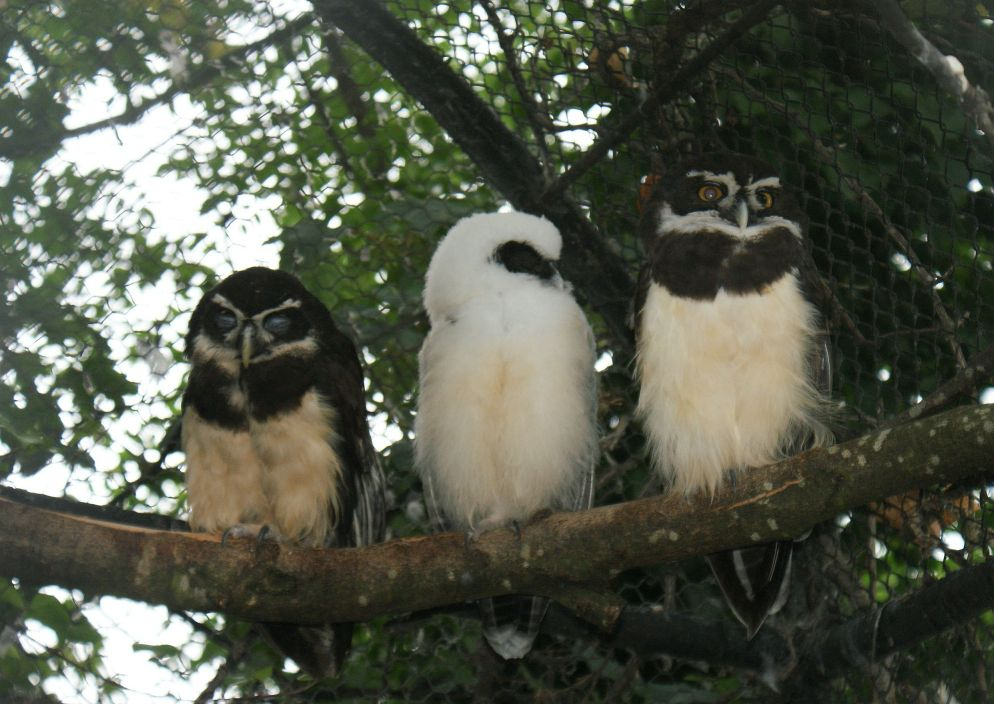
Male and female with their chick at the London Zoo.

This species is largely nocturnal, starting activity right around the time of the last light at dusk and usually being back on their roosts for the day around the first light. It is a solitary, unsocial bird, usually roosting singly each day and only peaceable associating with others of their own species for reproductive purposes.

The spectacled owl is typically the largest and most dominant owl in its range, with the larger great horned owl (Bubo virginianus) rarely venturing into true rainforest habitats. Most hunting starts with the owl perched on a branch and scanning the area, then dropping with a quick pounce when prey is located. It preys principally on a wide array of mammals, eating almost anything that is nocturnally active. Various rodents may be primary but virtually any type of small mammal in its habitat is vulnerable. The primary food by far in Oaxaca, Mexico was the Peters's climbing rat (Tylomys nudicaudus) followed by mouse opossums (Marmosa ssp.) of unidentified species. Numerous bats, such as greater spear-nosed bats (Phyllostomus hastatus) and broad-eared bats (Nyctinomops laticaudatus), are also rather vulnerable apparently. Smaller monkeys such as tamarins (Saguinus ssp.) may be vulnerable to predation. Prey species can be heavier than the preying owl, weigh over 1.5 kg (3.3 lb), possibly up to 2 to 4 kg (4.4 to 8.8 lb) in Didelphis opossums, Mephitis skunks and agoutis (Dasyprocta ssp.). Even the three-toed sloth (Bradypus variegatus) has been reported to have been killed, specifically an adult female estimated at 3.5 to 4.5 kg (7.7 to 9.9 lb) in weight or more than four times the weight of the owl itself. Invertebrates are eaten regularly as well, second only in importance to mammals, mainly caterpillars, but also crabs, snails, large insects, and spiders. Insects may be gleaned directly from foliage while the large owls actively forage. Frogs are also recorded amongst their prey. Birds are also taken, including mainly medium-sized species in the average weight range of 100 to 500 g (3.5 to 17.6 oz), such as jays, oropendolas (Psarocolius ssp.), motmots (Momota ssp.), and pigeons (Patagioenas ssp.), which are taken off of their nocturnal perches and perhaps smaller types of owl (e.g. Megascops ssp.). Little is known about how spectacled owls interact with other owls but in a study where playback of a number of owl species was played in Costa Rica, spectacled owls appeared to be the least responsive, neither vocally stimulated by the calling of other owl species nor by playback of calls of their own species.

=== Reproduction ===
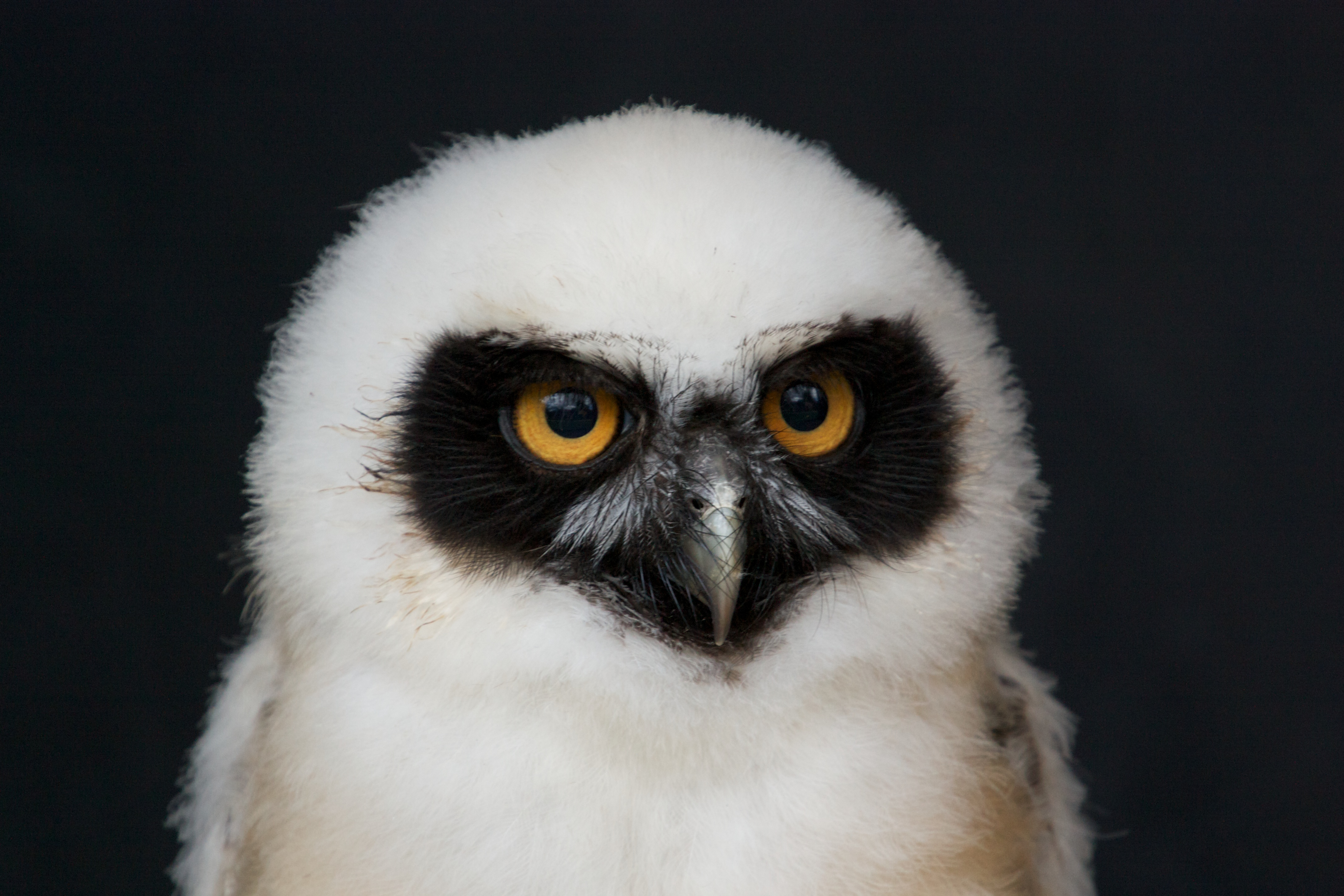
The young

In Costa Rica, eggs are laid variously in the dry season (November–May), or at the start of the wet season (June–July). This owl typically nests in an unlined tree cavity but may also use the crutch of a large tree. Like all owls, they do not build a nest so just lay their nest on the bare surface of the wood given, usually rotting wood in the case of tree cavities. Spectacled owls lay 1-2 eggs, which are incubated entirely or almost so by the female for about 5 weeks. If two eggs are hatched, often only one of the chicks will survive, the smaller chick usually perishing via starvation or by aggression from the larger nestling. Chicks leave the nest for surrounding branches at about 5–6 weeks but cannot usually fly well at this stage. However, they tend to depend on their parents for several months after leaving the nest and may be cared for and fed for up to a year once fledged, inhibiting the pair's ability to have young the following year. Spectacled owls may breed while still in immature plumage since it may take up to five years before full adult plumage is obtained.

== Status ==
The spectacled owl occurs over a very large range and is still a resident in much of its range. Due to this, it is classified as Least Concern by the IUCN. However, being a large, slow-maturing bird of prey with a strong sense of territoriality, it as a rule occurs at low densities. In areas where prey populations are hunted by people and habitats are destroyed or compromised, they may decrease. This is the likely source of extinction for an entire race on Trinidad (P. p. trinitatis). Occasionally, when roads are cut into the forest, they are killed by automobile collisions.

== Gallery ==
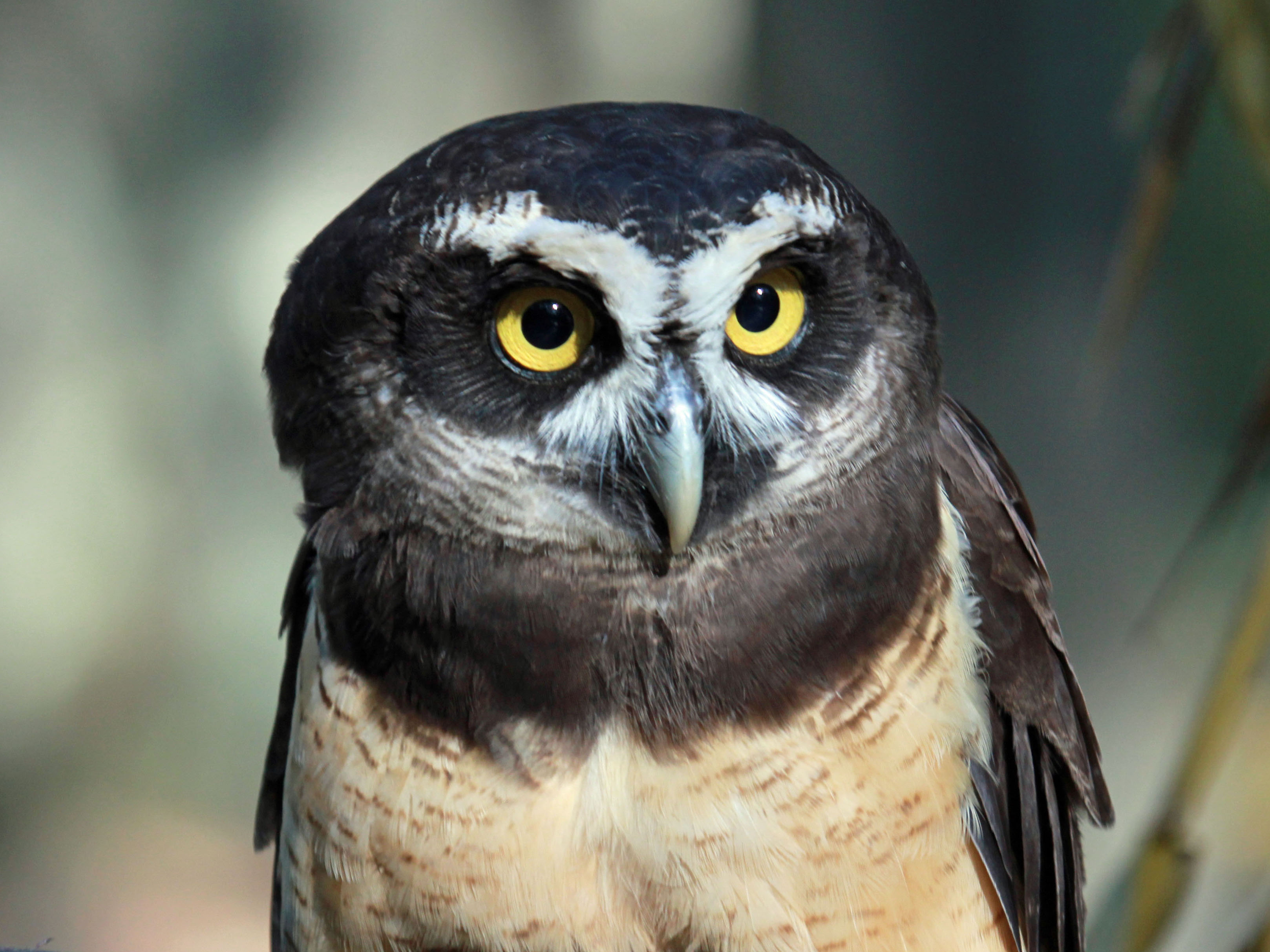
Close-up of head

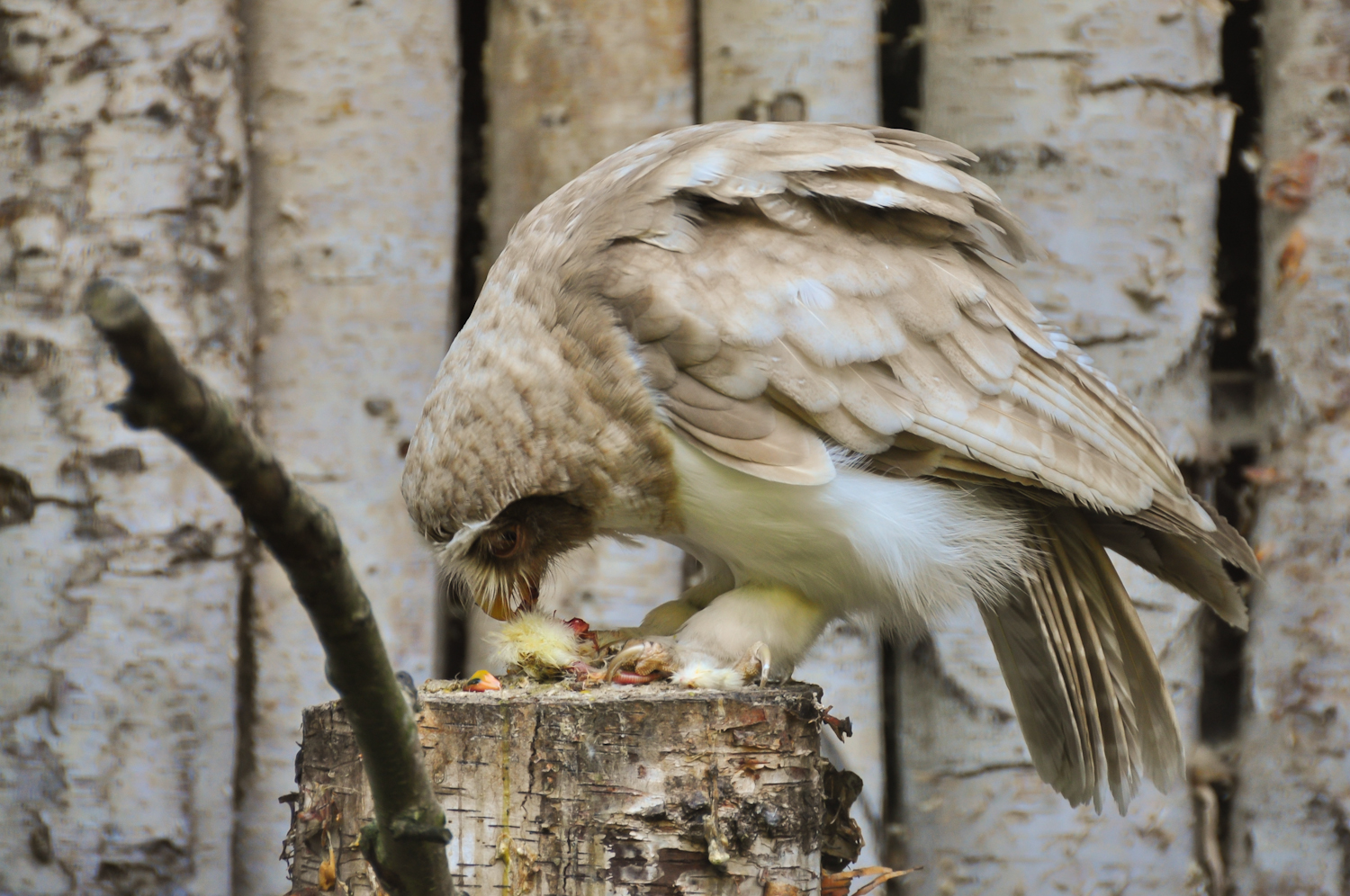
The spectacled owl consuming prey

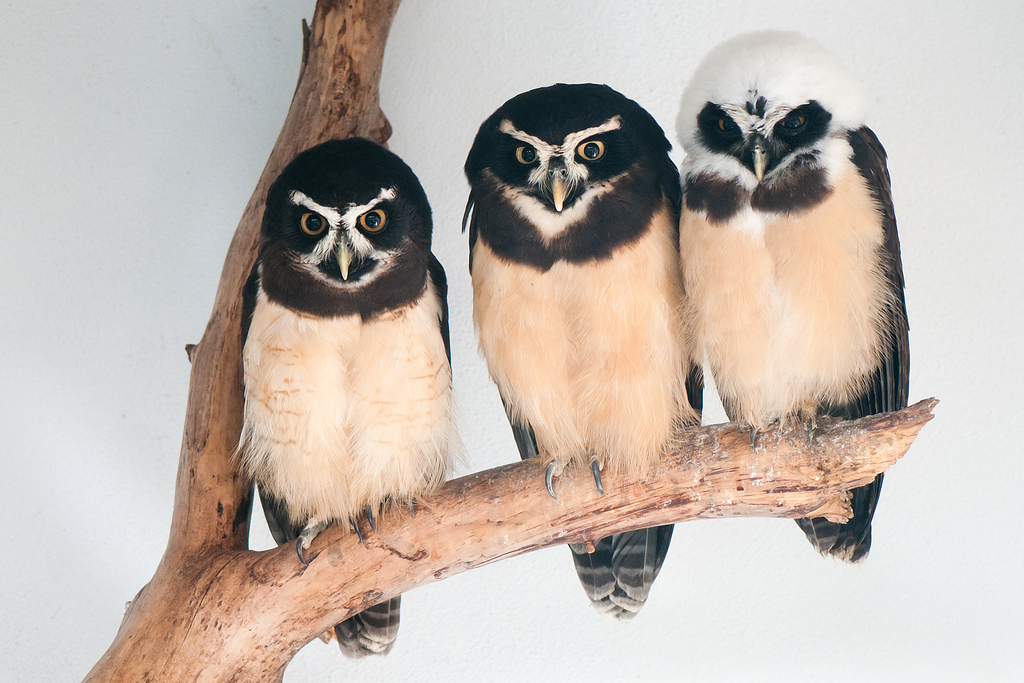
Two adults and one juvenile in captivity
