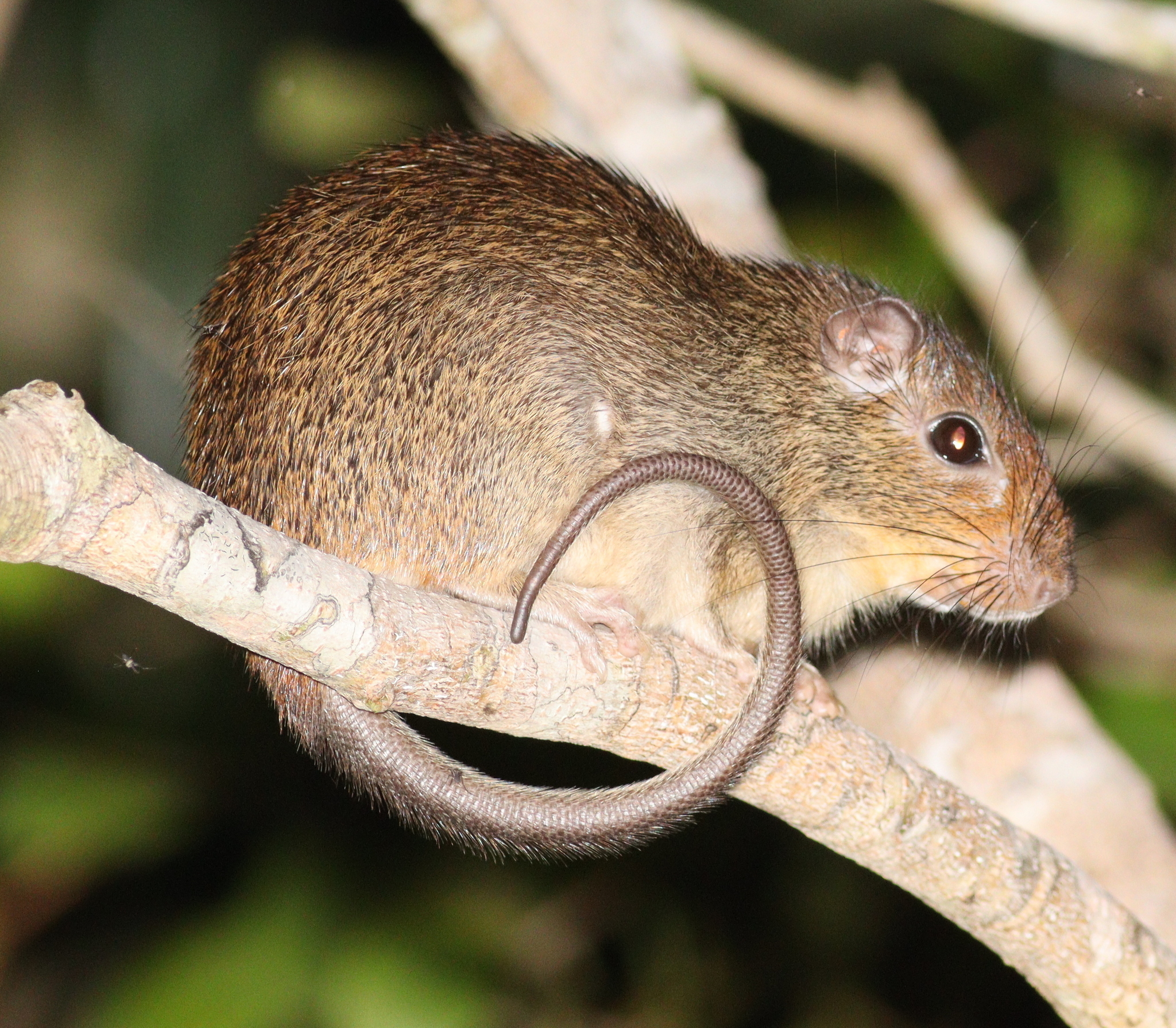

Conservation status
- Least Concern (IUCN 3.1)

Scientific classification
- Kingdom: Animalia
- Phylum: Chordata
- Class: Mammalia
- Infraclass: Placentalia
- Order: Rodentia
- Family: Echimyidae
- Subfamily: Echimyinae
- Tribe: Echimyini
- Genus: Makalata
- Species: M. didelphoides

Binomial name
- Makalata didelphoides (Desmarest, 1817)
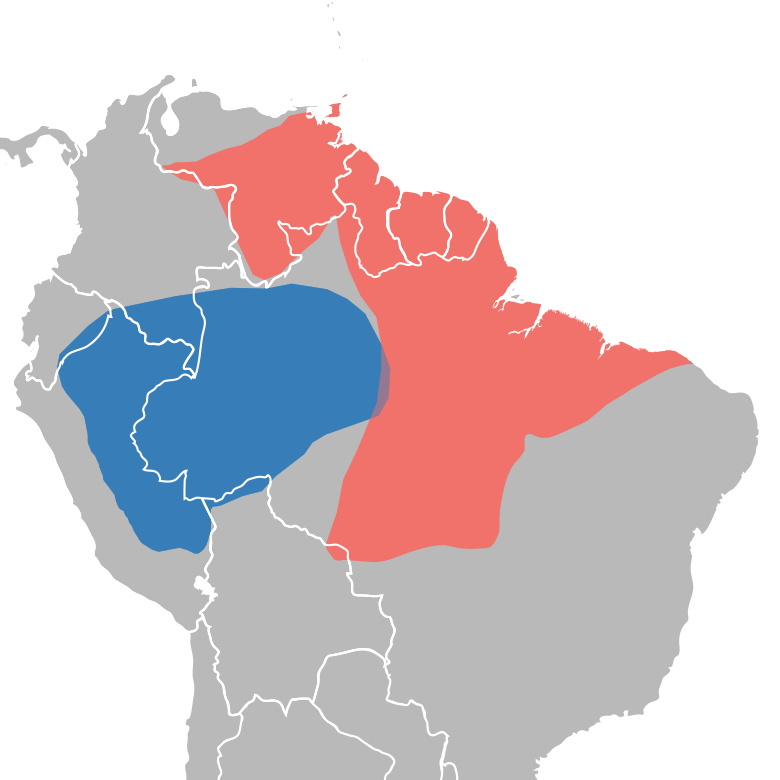
- Makalata distribution M. didelphoides in red

Synonyms
- Echimys didelphoides Desmarest, 1817; Mesomys didelphoides (Desmarest, 1817); Makalata armata (I. Geoffroy, 1838); Makalata castanea (Allen & Chapman, 1893); Makalata guianae (Thomas, 1888); Makalata hispida (Lichtenstein, 1830); Echimys longirostris Anthony, 1921

= Brazilian spiny tree-rat =

Brazilian spiny tree rat

Species of rodent

The Brazilian spiny tree rat (Makalata didelphoides) is a species of rodent in the family Echimyidae. It is found in Bolivia, Brazil, French Guiana, Guyana, Suriname and Venezuela, where it lives in lowland tropical rainforest. There is also a population in Ecuador which is referable either to this species or to Makalata macrurus. It is nocturnal and eats seeds.
