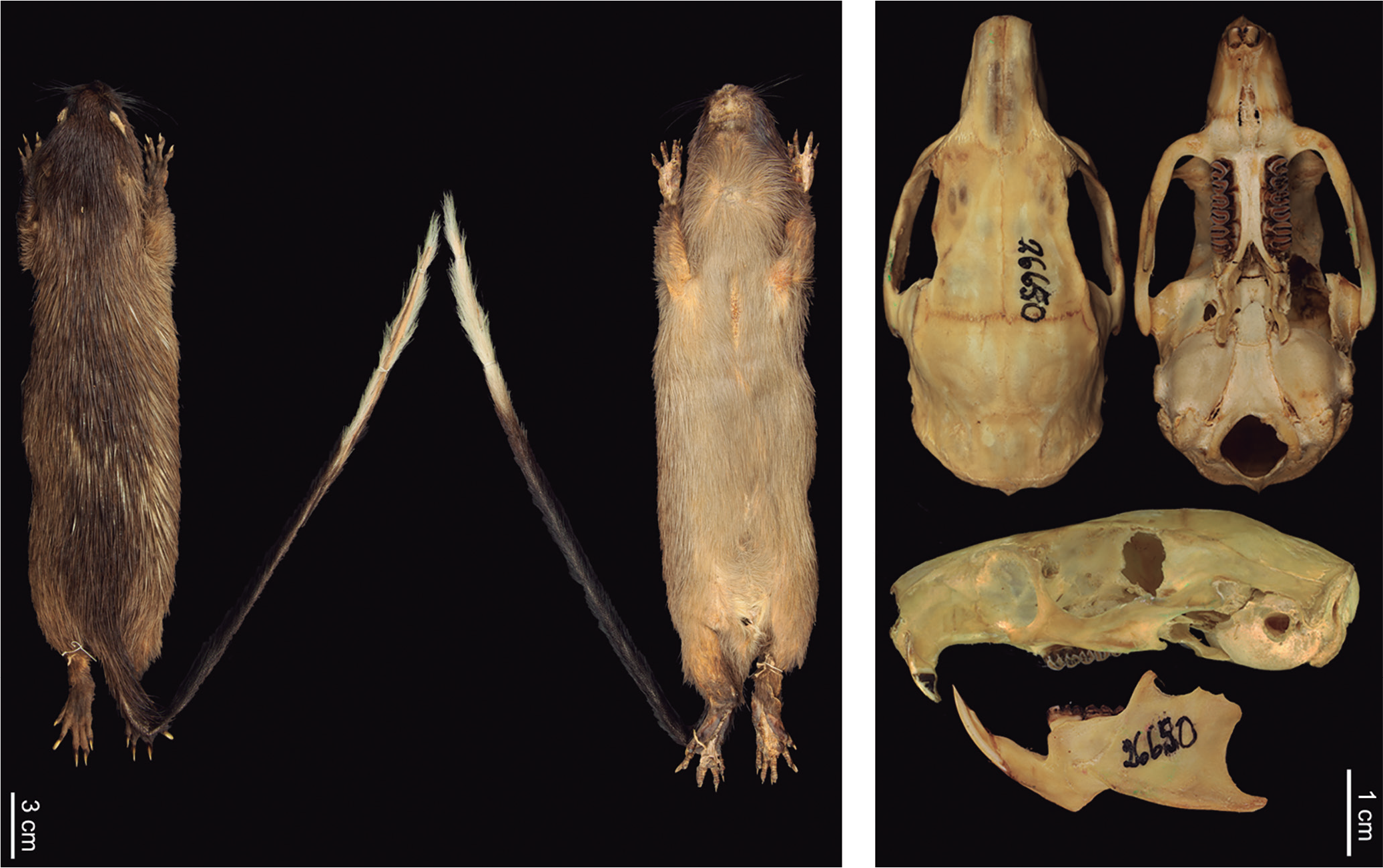
- Holotype of Vieira's spiny tree-rat

Conservation status
- Data Deficient (IUCN 3.1)

Scientific classification
- Kingdom: Animalia
- Phylum: Chordata
- Class: Mammalia
- Order: Rodentia
- Family: Echimyidae
- Genus: Echimys
- Species: E. vieirai

Binomial name
- Echimys vieirai Iack-Ximenes, de Vivo, & Percequillo, 2005
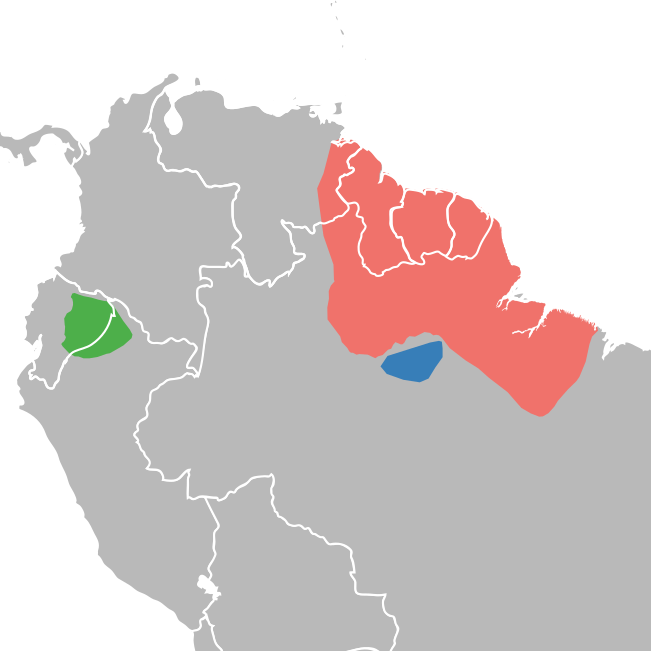
- Echimys distribution E. vieirai in blue

= Vieira's spiny tree-rat =

Species of rodent

Vieira's spiny tree-rat (Echimys vieirai) is a species of spiny rat from South America. It is found in the Amazonas and Pará states of Brazil and is distinguished from other tree-dweling spiny rats by its fur color and patterns. It is a small rat with a dark maroon stripe on its head, dull to dark brown fur on most of its body, and a grayish brown underbelly. The species was described in 2005 based on two preserved museum specimens belonging to the genus Echimys.

This spiny rat is poorly studied, and is thought to be a nocturnal species, feeding on leaves, fruits, and possibly arthropods. The International Union for Conservation of Nature (IUCN) classifies it as a data deficient species on the IUCN Red List.

== Taxonomy ==
Vieira's spiny tree-rat was first described by Brazilian mammalogists Gilson Evaristo Iack-Ximenes, Mario de Vivo, and Alexandre Reis Percequillo in 2005 as a member of the genus Echimys, the spiny rats. This genus had undergone significant changes since it was erected in 1809 by Georges Cuvier, and the authors of the 2005 paper sought to clarify the members of the genus. In so doing, they identified two specimens that differed significantly in appearance from the known spiny rat species, enough to justify erecting a new species. The species' type locality was identified as "Barreirinha, right bank of the Tapajós, Para State, Brazil". No subspecies of this spiny rat are known.

The species name vieirai is a patronym for the Brazilian mammalogist Carlos Octaviano da Cunha Vieira, curator of the Mammal Collection at the Museum of Zoology of the University of São Paulo (MZUSP), from the early 1940s to 1958. The two known specimens in this species, the holotype and a paratype collected in Amazonas, Brazil, are housed at the MZUSP and the National Museum of Brazil (MNRJ), respectively. The MZUSP specimen was collected by P.E. Vanzolini on June 24, 1970, while the MNRJ specimen was collected by A. Parko on an unknown date. Both specimens are of young individuals.

== Description ==
Vieira's spiny tree-rat is a small rat, with an average adult head and body length of 24.5 centimeters (9.6 inches) and average tail length of 34 cm (13 in). It is covered in stiff, bristled fur, dark brown above and light brown underneath. The brown fur is dull throughout most of the body, but gets darker towards the head. Among members of the Echimyidae family, the genus Echimys has some of the most spinose guard hairs or spines, meaning that they are very stiff and robust and have blunt tips. The purpose of these hairs and differences within the family in terms of guard hair softness is thought to be tied to ancestral habitat preference and need for thermoregulation, as softer, denser fur is better at holding on to warmth. Its main diagnostic trait is the presence of a dark maroon stripe on the median of the head, running down the back.

As compared to the white-faced spiny tree-rat (Echimys chrysurus), the fur on the back of Vieira's spiny tree-rat is darker. Vieira's spiny tree-rat can be distinguished from the dark spiny tree-rat (Echimys saturnus) by its distinctly separate dark head and lighter-colored back, while E. saturnus is more uniformly black in these areas. E. saturnus also has a gray or spotted white underside, which is contrasted with the light brown fur seen in E. vieirai.

== Range and distribution ==
This spiny rat is known to occur in the Brazilian states of Amazonas and Pará. Based on the two localities where it has been found, the species is presumed to inhabit mature lowland rainforests.

== Behavior and ecology ==
As little specific information is known about Vieira's spiny tree rat, much is assumed based on the life history of similar rodents. It is presumed to be arboreal and nocturnal, and its diet is likely made up of fruits, leaves, and potentially arthropods.

== Conservation ==
Because so little is known about Vieira's spiny tree-rat, it is considered a data deficient species by the international Union for Conservation of Nature. It is known to occur in at least one protected area, that being the Tapajós National Forest in Pará, Brazil.
