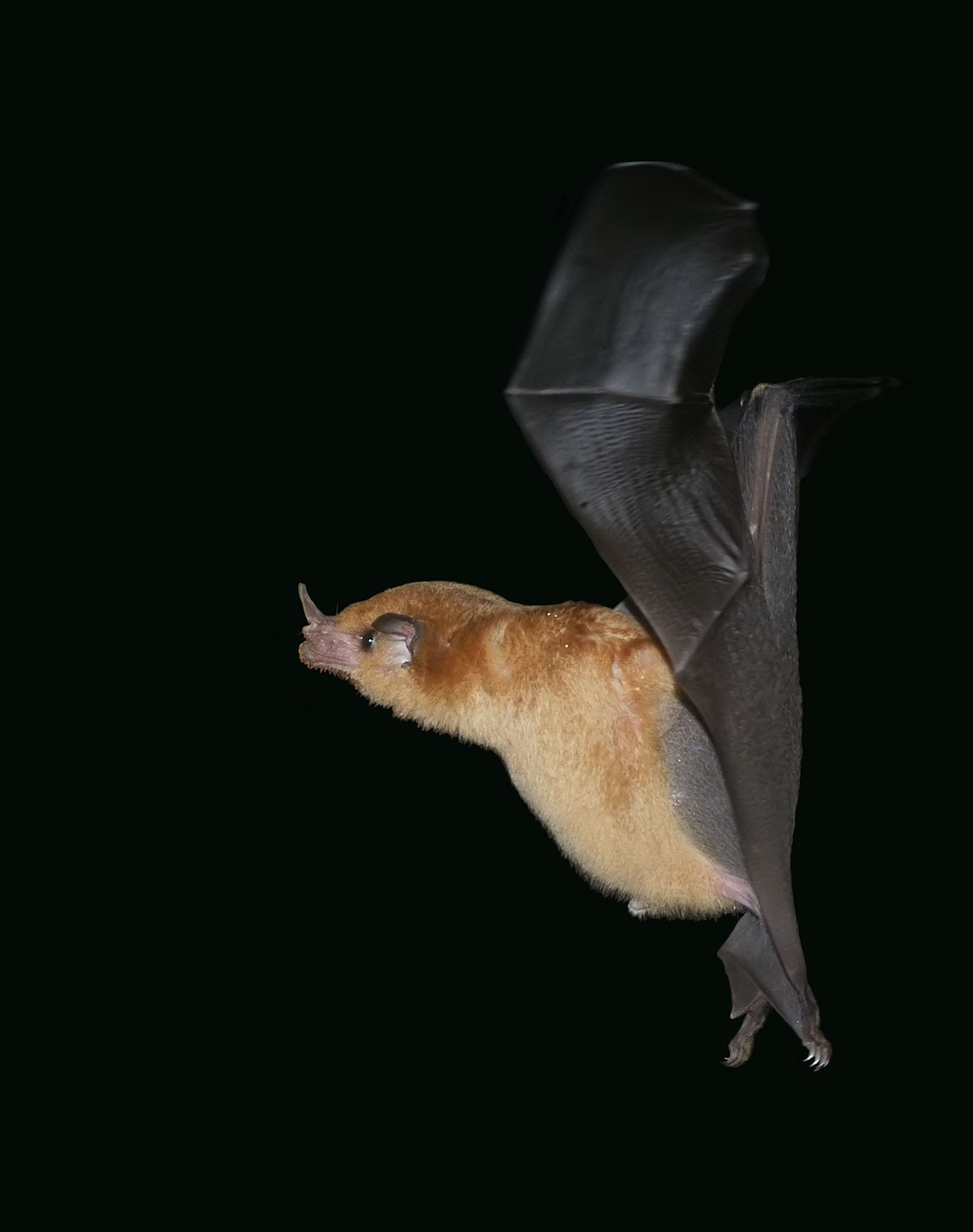
- Orange nectar bat

Scientific classification
- Domain: Eukaryota
- Kingdom: Animalia
- Phylum: Chordata
- Class: Mammalia
- Order: Chiroptera
- Family: Phyllostomidae
- Subfamily: Lonchophyllinae; Griffiths, 1982

Tribes & Genera
- Lonchophyllini Lionycteris Lonchophylla Platalina Xeronycteris Hsunycterini Hsunycteris

= Lonchophyllinae =

Subfamily of bats

Lonchophyllinae is a subfamily of leaf-nosed bats.

== List of species ==
Subfamily: Lonchophyllinae

- Tribe Lonchophyllini
  - Genus: Lionycteris
    - Chestnut long-tongued bat, Lionycteris spurrelli
  - Genus: Lonchophylla
    - Bokermann's nectar bat, Lonchophylla bokermanni
    - Chocoan long-tongued bat, Lonchophylla chocoana
    - Dekeyser's nectar bat, Lonchophylla dekeyseri
    - Lonchophylla fornicata
    - Handley's nectar bat, Lonchophylla handleyi
    - Western nectar bat, Lonchophylla hesperia
    - Goldman's nectar bat, Lonchophylla mordax
    - Orcés’s long-tongued bat, Lonchophylla orcesi
    - Lonchophylla orienticollina
    - Orange nectar bat, Lonchophylla robusta
  - Genus: Platalina
    - Long-snouted bat, Platalina genovensium
  - Genus: Xeronycteris
    - Vieira's long-tongued bat, Xeronycteris vieirai
- Tribe Hsunycterini
  - Genus: Hsunycteris
    - Cadena's long-tongued bat, Hsunycteris cadenai
    - Dashe's nectar bat, Hsunycteris dashe
    - Patton's long-tongued bat, Hsunycteris pattoni
    - Thomas's nectar bat, Hsunycteris thomasi
