= Western nectar bat =

Conservation status
- Near Threatened (IUCN 3.1)

Scientific classification
- Kingdom: Animalia
- Phylum: Chordata
- Class: Mammalia
- Order: Chiroptera
- Family: Phyllostomidae
- Genus: Lonchophylla
- Species: L. hesperia

Binomial name
- Lonchophylla hesperia G.M. Allen, 1908

Species of bat

The western nectar bat (Lonchophylla hesperia) is a species of leaf-nosed bat within the Lonchophylla genus. It is found in Ecuador and Peru.

== Etymology ==
The western nectar bat was first described by Glover Morrill Allen in 1908. The name hesperia comes from the Greek word hesperos, meaning western. This refers to the geographical distribution of the western nectar bat as it has only been found in the western part of South America.

== Biology ==
=== Physical description ===
L. hesperia is one of the smaller members of the tribe Lonchophyllini, weighing about 10 g (0.35 oz). The fur on its back is pale brown, and its belly is a grayish brown that is lighter in color than its back. It has a skull length between 24.8–28 mm (0.98–1.10 in).

== Range and habitat ==
The Western nectar bat is endemic to northwestern Peru and has been recorded in Peru and Ecuador. Their distribution has only been recorded as west of the Andes Mountains. The species has been categorized as restricted to areas lacking rainforest — arid desert to savanna and dry forest. As of 2011, the western nectar bat is only known from 19 individuals from 9 locations, 6 of which were captured in 1908.

=== Phylogeny ===
The following phylogenetic tree shows the currently known species of Lonchophyllini, the tribe that includes L. hesperia within the subfamily Lynchophyllinae.

- Lonchophyllini
  - Lionycteris
  - - - Lonchophylla mordax
      - - Lonchophylla dekeyseri
        - - Lonchophylla bokermanni
          - - Lonchophylla hesperia
            - - Lonchophylla concava
              - - Platalina
                - Xeronycteris
    - - - Lonchophylla cadenai
        - - Lonchophylla pattoni
          - Lonchophylla thomasi
      - - Lonchophylla chocoana
        - - Lonchophylla orcesi
          - - Lonchophylla handleyi
            - Lonchophylla robusta
