= List of mammals of Ecuador =

There are 317 mammal species recorded in Ecuador, of which two are critically endangered, ten are endangered, twenty-three are vulnerable, and seven are near threatened. Two of the species listed for Ecuador are considered to be extinct.

The following tags are used to highlight each species' conservation status as assessed by the International Union for Conservation of Nature:

EX	Extinct	No reasonable doubt that the last individual has died.
EW	Extinct in the wild	Known only to survive in captivity or as a naturalized populations well outside its previous range.
CR	Critically endangered	The species is in imminent risk of extinction in the wild.
EN	Endangered	The species is facing an extremely high risk of extinction in the wild.
VU	Vulnerable	The species is facing a high risk of extinction in the wild.
NT	Near threatened	The species does not meet any of the criteria that would categorise it as risking extinction but it is likely to do so in the future.
LC	Least concern	There are no current identifiable risks to the species.
DD	Data deficient	There is inadequate information to make an assessment of the risks to this species.

Some species were assessed using an earlier set of criteria. Species assessed using this system have the following instead of near threatened and least concern categories:

LR/cd	Lower risk/conservation dependent	Species which were the focus of conservation programmes and may have moved into a higher risk category if that programme was discontinued.
LR/nt	Lower risk/near threatened	Species which are close to being classified as vulnerable but are not the subject of conservation programmes.
LR/lc	Lower risk/least concern	Species for which there are no identifiable risks.

== Subclass: Theria ==
=== Infraclass: Eutheria ===
==== Order: Sirenia (manatees and dugongs) ====
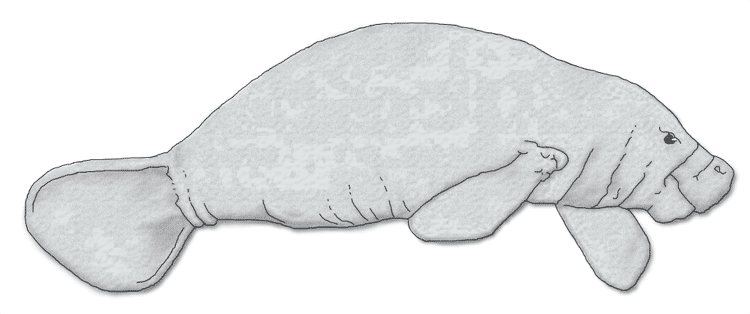
Amazonian manatee

Sirenia is an order of fully aquatic, herbivorous mammals that inhabit rivers, estuaries, coastal marine waters, swamps, and marine wetlands. All four species are endangered.

- Family: Trichechidae
  - Genus: Trichechus
    - Amazonian manatee, T. inunguis VU

==== Order: Cingulata (armadillos) ====
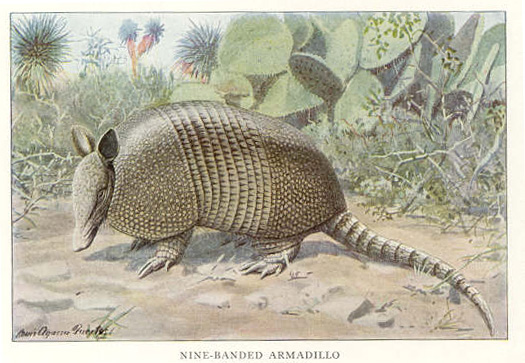
Nine-banded armadillo

The armadillos are small mammals with a bony armored shell. They are native to the Americas. There are around 20 extant species.

- Family: Dasypodidae (armadillos)
  - Subfamily: Dasypodinae
    - Genus: Dasypus
      - Greater long-nosed armadillo, Dasypus kappleri LC
      - Nine-banded armadillo, Dasypus novemcinctus LC
  - Subfamily: Tolypeutinae
    - Genus: Cabassous
      - Southern naked-tailed armadillo, Cabassous unicinctus LC
    - Genus: Priodontes
      - Giant armadillo, Priodontes maximus VU

==== Order: Pilosa (anteaters, sloths and tamanduas) ====
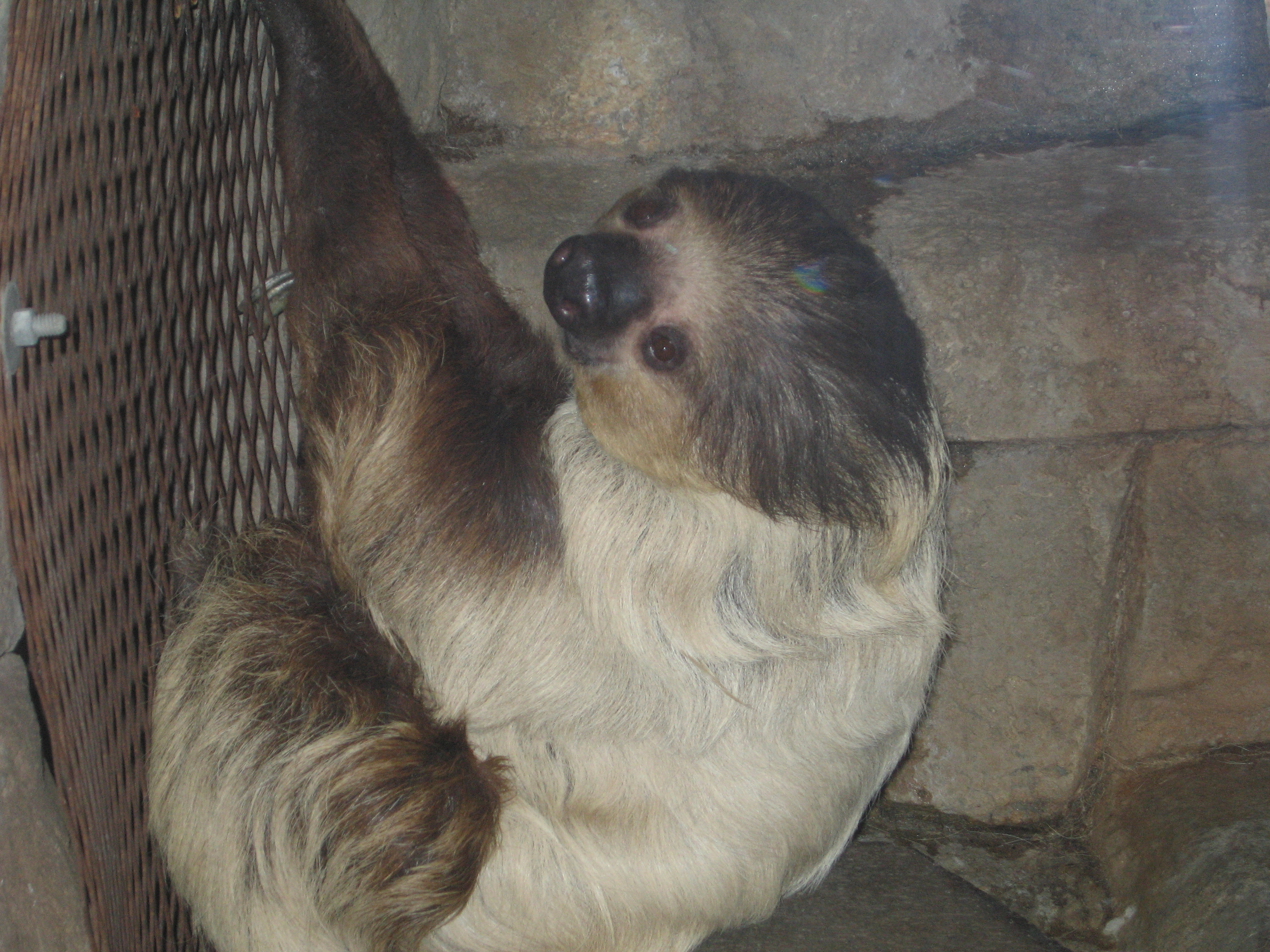
Hoffmann's two-toed sloth

The order Pilosa is extant only in the Americas and includes the anteaters, sloths, and tamanduas.

- Suborder: Folivora
  - Family: Bradypodidae (three-toed sloths)
    - Genus: Bradypus
      - Brown-throated three-toed sloth, Bradypus variegatus LC
  - Family: Choloepodidae (two-toed sloths)
    - Genus: Choloepus
      - Linnaeus's two-toed sloth, Choloepus didactylus LC
      - Hoffmann's two-toed sloth, Choloepus hoffmanni LC
- Suborder: Vermilingua
  - Family: Cyclopedidae
    - Genus: Cyclopes
      - Silky anteater, C. didactylus LC
      - Central American silky anteater, C. dorsalis NE
  - Family: Myrmecophagidae (American anteaters)
    - Genus: Myrmecophaga
      - Giant anteater, Myrmecophaga tridactyla NT
    - Genus: Tamandua
      - Northern tamandua, Tamandua mexicana LC
      - Southern tamandua, Tamandua tetradactyla LC

==== Order: Primates ====
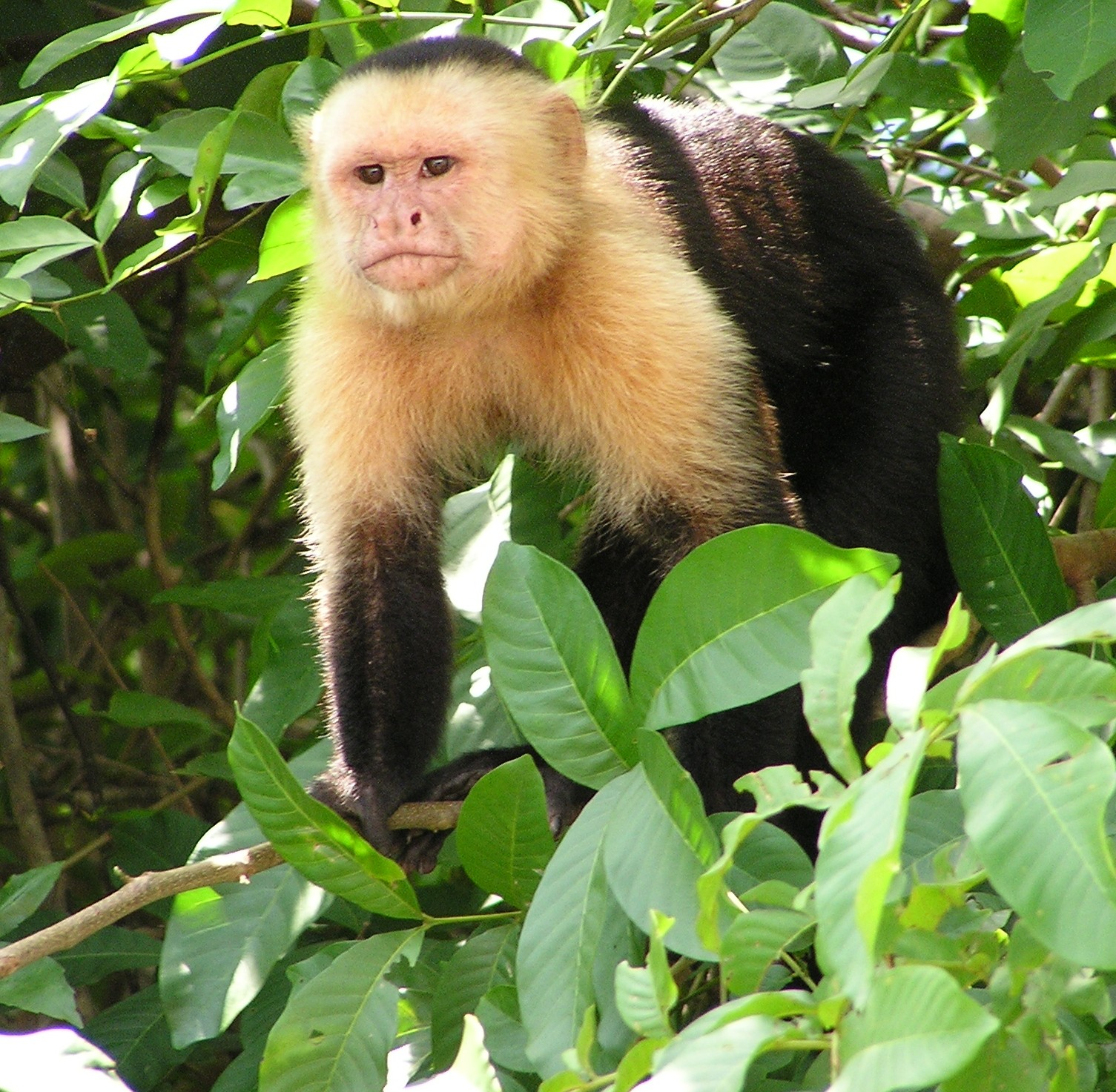
White-headed capuchin

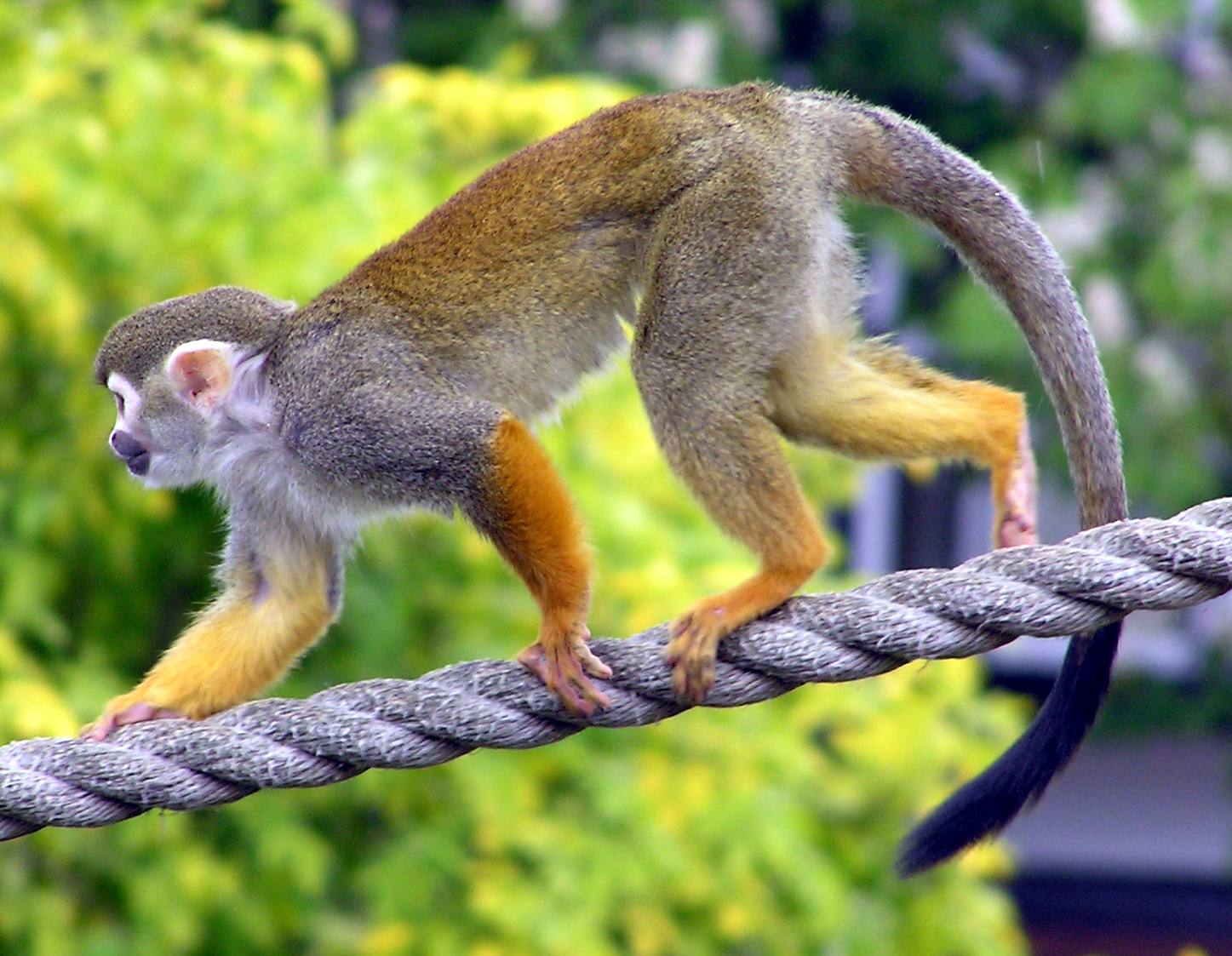
Common squirrel monkey

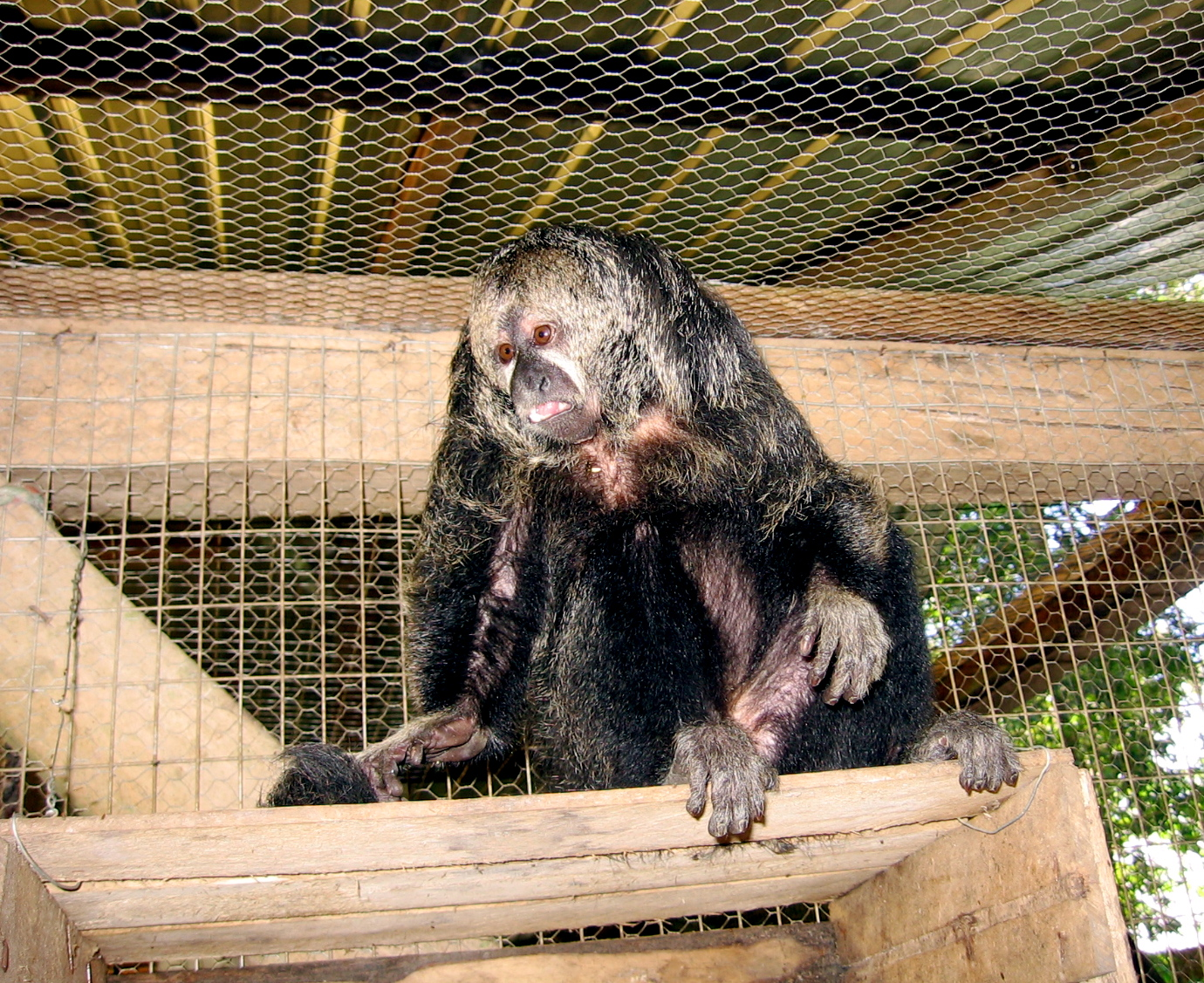
Monk saki

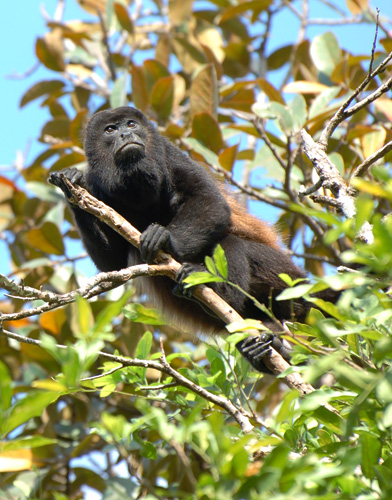
Mantled howler

The order Primates contains humans and their closest relatives: lemurs, lorisoids, monkeys, and apes.

- Suborder: Haplorhini
  - Infraorder: Simiiformes
    - Parvorder: Platyrrhini (New World monkeys)
      - Family: Cebidae
        - Subfamily: Callitrichinae
          - Genus: Callithrix
            - Pygmy marmoset, Cebuella pygmaea LC
          - Genus: Leontocebus
            - Red-mantled saddle-back tamarin, Leontocebus lagonotus LC
            - Black-mantled tamarin, Leontocebus nigricollis LC
            - Golden-mantled tamarin, Leontocebus tripartitus LC
        - Subfamily: Cebinae
          - Genus: Cebus
            - Ecuadorian capuchin, Cebus aequatorialis CR
            - Colombian white-faced capuchin, Cebus capucinus LC
            - Marañón white-fronted capuchin, Cebus yuracus
          - Genus: Sapajus
            - Large-headed capuchin, Sapajus macrocephalus LC
          - Genus: Saimiri
            - Humboldt's squirrel monkey, Saimiri cassiquiarensis
      - Family: Aotidae
        - Genus: Aotus
          - Gray-bellied night monkey, Aotus lemurinus VU
          - Spix's night monkey, Aotus vociferans LC
      - Family: Pitheciidae
        - Subfamily: Callicebinae
          - Genus: Callicebus
            - White-tailed titi, Callicebus discolor LC
            - Lucifer titi, Callicebus lucifer LC
        - Subfamily: Pitheciinae
          - Genus: Pithecia
            - Equatorial saki, Pithecia aequatorialis LR/lc
            - Monk saki, Pithecia monachus LC
      - Family: Atelidae
        - Subfamily: Alouattinae
          - Genus: Alouatta
            - Mantled howler, Alouatta palliata LC
            - Venezuelan red howler, Alouatta seniculus LC
        - Subfamily: Atelinae
          - Genus: Ateles
            - White-fronted spider monkey, Ateles belzebuth VU
            - Black-headed spider monkey, Ateles fusciceps CR
          - Genus: Lagothrix
            - Brown woolly monkey, Lagothrix lagothricha LR/lc
            - Silvery woolly monkey, Lagothrix poeppigii NT

==== Order: Rodentia (rodents) ====
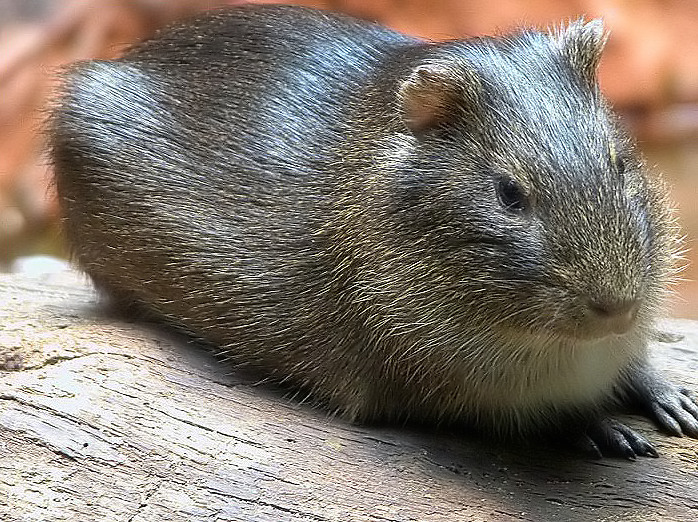
Brazilian guinea pig

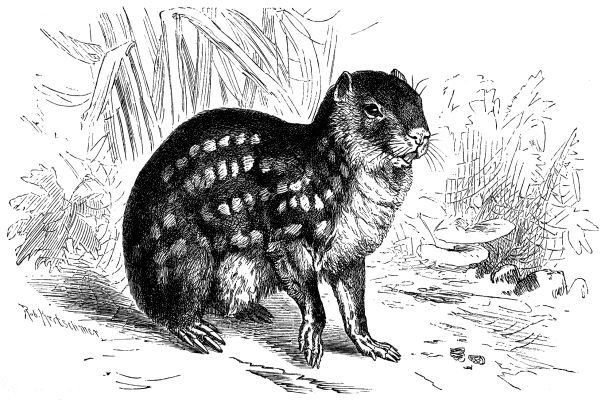
Lowland paca

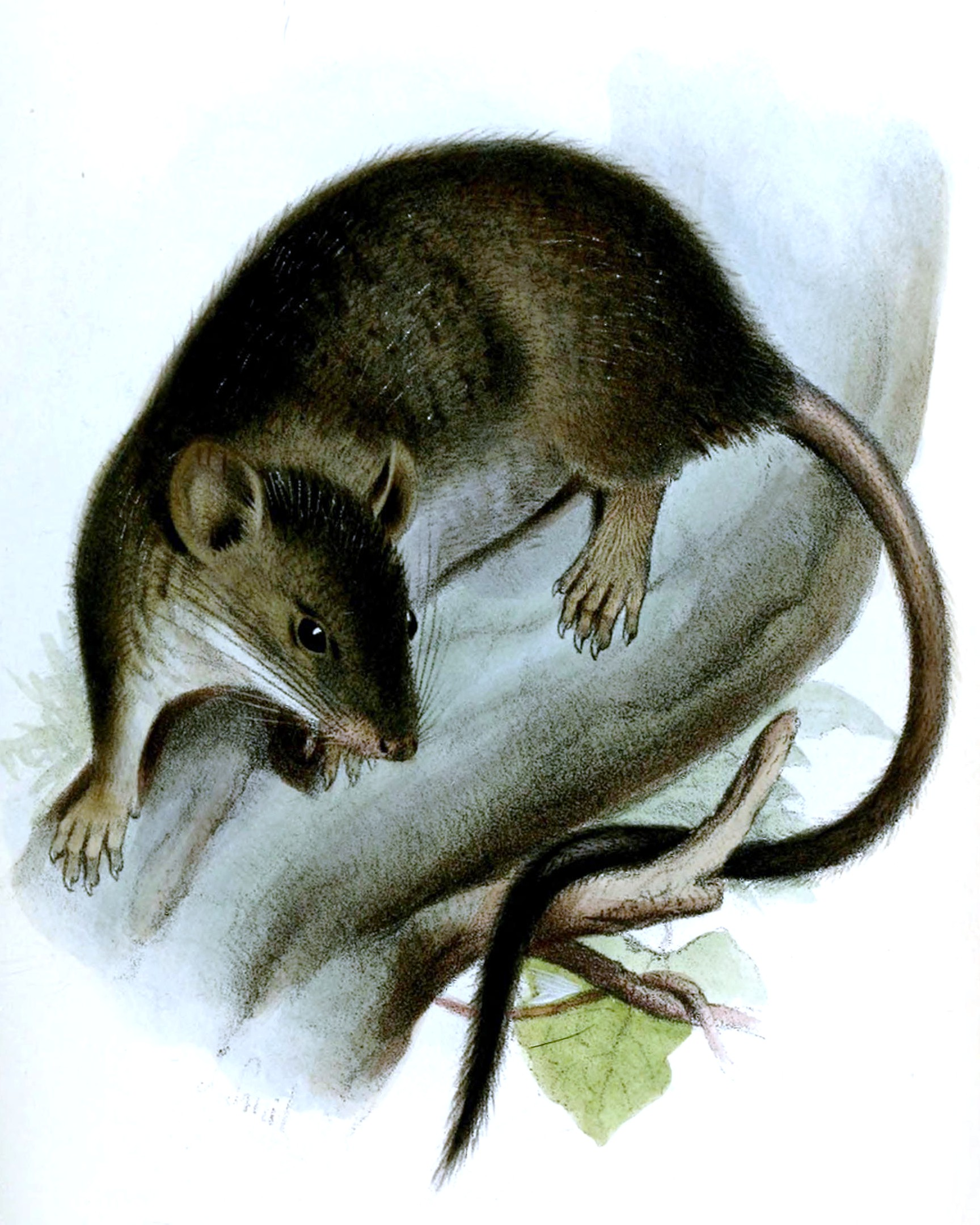
White-footed climbing mouse

Rodents make up the largest order of mammals, with over 40% of mammalian species. They have two incisors in the upper and lower jaw which grow continually and must be kept short by gnawing. Most rodents are small though the capybara can weigh up to 45 kg (99 lb).

- Suborder: Hystricognathi
  - Family: Erethizontidae (New World porcupines)
    - Subfamily: Erethizontinae
      - Genus: Coendou
        - Bicolor-spined porcupine, Coendou bicolor LR/lc
  - Family: Dinomyidae (pacarana)
    - Genus: Dinomys
      - Pacarana, Dinomys branickii EN
  - Family: Caviidae (guinea pigs)
    - Subfamily: Caviinae
      - Genus: Cavia
        - Brazilian guinea pig, Cavia aperea LR/lc
        - Guinea pig, Cavia porcellus LR/lc
      - Subfamily: Hydrochoerinae (capybaras and rock cavies)
        - Genus: Hydrochoerus
          - Capybara, Hydrochoerus hydrochaeris LR/lc
  - Family: Dasyproctidae (agoutis and pacas)
    - Genus: Dasyprocta
      - Black agouti, Dasyprocta fuliginosa LR/lc
      - Central American agouti, Dasyprocta punctata LR/lc
    - Genus: Myoprocta
      - Red acouchi, Myoprocta acouchy LR/lc
      - Red acouchi, Myoprocta exilis DD
  - Family: Cuniculidae
    - Genus: Cuniculus
      - Lowland paca, Cuniculus paca LC
      - Mountain paca, Cuniculus taczanowskii LR/nt
  - Family: Echimyidae
    - Subfamily: Dactylomyinae
      - Genus: Dactylomys
        - Amazon bamboo rat, Dactylomys dactylinus LR/lc
    - Subfamily: Echimyinae
      - Genus: Diplomys
        - Colombian soft-furred spiny rat, Diplomys caniceps LR/nt
      - Genus: Echimys
        - Dark spiny tree-rat, Echimys saturnus LR/lc
      - Genus: Makalata
        - Brazilian spiny tree-rat, Makalata didelphoides LR/lc
        - Bare-tailed armored tree-rat, Makalata occasius CR
    - Subfamily: Eumysopinae
      - Genus: Hoplomys
        - Armored rat, Hoplomys gymnurus LR/lc
      - Genus: Mesomys
        - Ferreira's spiny tree rat, Mesomys hispidus LR/lc
      - Genus: Proechimys
        - Pacific spiny rat, Proechimys decumanus LR/lc
        - Short-tailed spiny rat, Proechimys brevicauda LR/lc
        - Napo spiny rat, Proechimys quadruplicatus LR/lc
        - Tome's spiny-rat, Proechimys semispinosus LR/lc
        - Simon's spiny rat, Proechimys simonsi LR/lc
- Suborder: Sciurognathi
  - Family: Sciuridae (squirrels)
    - Subfamily: Sciurinae
      - Tribe: Sciurini
        - Genus: Microsciurus
          - Amazon dwarf squirrel, Microsciurus flaviventer LR/lc
          - Western dwarf squirrel, Microsciurus mimulus LR/lc
        - Genus: Sciurus
          - Red-tailed squirrel, Sciurus granatensis LR/lc
          - Northern Amazon red squirrel, Sciurus igniventris LR/lc
          - Southern Amazon red squirrel, Sciurus spadiceus LR/lc
          - Guayaquil squirrel, Sciurus stramineus LR/lc
  - Family: Heteromyidae
    - Subfamily: Heteromyinae
      - Genus: Heteromys
        - Southern spiny pocket mouse, Heteromys australis LR/lc
  - Family: Cricetidae
    - Subfamily: Tylomyinae
      - Genus: Tylomys
        - Mira climbing rat, Tylomys mirae LR/lc
    - Subfamily: Neotominae
      - Genus: Reithrodontomys
        - Mexican harvest mouse, Reithrodontomys mexicanus LR/lc
    - Subfamily: Sigmodontinae
      - Genus: Aegialomys
        - Galápagos rice rat, Aegialomys galapagoensis VU
        - Yellowish rice rat, Aegialomys xantheolus LR/lc
      - Genus: Aepeomys
        - Olive montane mouse, Aepeomys lugens LR/lc
      - Genus: Akodon
        - Highland grass mouse, Akodon aerosus LR/lc
        - Ecuadorian grass mouse, Akodon latebricola LR/lc
        - Soft grass mouse, Akodon mollis LR/lc
      - Genus: Anotomys
        - Aquatic rat, Anotomys leander EN
      - Genus: Chilomys
        - Colombian forest mouse, Chilomys instans LR/lc
      - Genus: Euryoryzomys
        - MacConnell's rice rat, Euryoryzomys macconnelli LR/lc
      - Genus: Handleyomys
        - Alfaro's rice rat, Handleyomys alfaroi LR/lc
      - Genus: Holochilus
        - Amazonian marsh rat, Holochilus sciureus LR/lc
      - Genus: Hylaeamys
        - Western Amazonian oryzomys, Hylaeamys perenensis LC
        - Tate's oryzomys, Hylaeamys tatei DD
        - Amazonian oryzomys, Hylaeamys yunganus LC
      - Genus: Ichthyomys
        - Crab-eating rat, Ichthyomys hydrobates LR/nt
        - Stolzmann's crab-eating rat, Ichthyomys stolzmanni LR/lc
        - Tweedy's crab-eating rat, Ichthyomys tweedii LR/lc
      - Genus: Melanomys
        - Dusky rice rat, Melanomys caliginosus LR/lc
        - Robust dark rice rat, Melanomys robustulus LR/lc
      - Genus: Microryzomys
        - Highland small rice rat, Microryzomys altissimus LR/lc
        - Forest small rice rat, Microryzomys minutus LR/lc
      - Genus: Mindomys
        - Hammond's rice rat, Mindomys hammondi LR/lc
      - Genus: Neacomys
        - Common neacomys, Neacomys spinosus LR/lc
        - Narrow-footed bristly mouse, Neacomys tenuipes LR/lc
      - Genus: Necromys
        - Spotted bolo mouse, Necromys punctulatus LR/lc
      - Genus: Nectomys
        - Western Amazonian nectomys, Nectomys apicalis
      - Genus: Nephelomys
        - Tomes's rice rat, Nephelomys albigularis LR/lc
        - Golden-bellied oryzomys, Nephelomys auriventer LR/lc
      - Genus: Nesoryzomys
        - Darwin's rice rat, Nesoryzomys darwini EX
        - Fernandina rice rat, Nesoryzomys fernandinae VU
        - Indefatigable Galapagos mouse, Nesoryzomys indefessus EX
        - Fernandina Island Galapagos mouse, Nesoryzomys narboroughi NT
        - Santiago Galapagos mouse, Nesoryzomys swarthi VU
      - Genus: Neusticomys
        - Montane fish-eating rat, Neusticomys monticolus LR/lc
      - Genus: Oecomys
        - Bicolored arboreal rice rat, Oecomys bicolor LR/lc
        - Foothill arboreal rice rat, Oecomys superans LR/lc
      - Genus: Oligoryzomys
        - Destructive pygmy rice rat, Oligoryzomys destructor DD
        - Fulvous pygmy rice rat, Oligoryzomys fulvescens LR/lc
      - Genus: Oreoryzomys
        - Peruvian rice rat, Oreoryzomys balneator LR/lc
      - Genus: Phyllotis
        - Andean leaf-eared mouse, Phyllotis andium LR/lc
        - Haggard's leaf-eared mouse, Phyllotis haggardi LR/lc
      - Genus: Rhipidomys
        - Coues's climbing mouse, Rhipidomys couesi LR/lc
        - Broad-footed climbing mouse, Rhipidomys latimanus LR/lc
        - White-footed climbing mouse, Rhipidomys leucodactylus LR/lc
        - Atlantic Forest climbing mouse, Rhipidomys mastacalis LR/lc
      - Genus: Scolomys
        - South American spiny mouse, Scolomys melanops EN
      - Genus: Sigmodon
        - Unexpected cotton rat, Sigmodon inopinatus LR/lc
        - Peruvian cotton rat, Sigmodon peruanus LR/lc
      - Genus: Sigmodontomys
        - Alfaro's rice water rat, Sigmodontomys alfari LR/lc
        - Long-tailed sigmodontomys, Sigmodontomys aphrastus DD
      - Genus: Transandinomys
        - Bolivar rice rat, Transandinomys bolivaris LR/lc
        - Talamancan rice rat, Transandinomys talamancae LR/lc
      - Genus: Thomasomys
        - Golden Oldfield mouse, Thomasomys aureus LR/lc
        - Beady-eyed mouse, Thomasomys baeops LR/lc
        - Ashy-bellied Oldfield mouse, Thomasomys cinereiventer LR/lc
        - Ash-colored Oldfield mouse, Thomasomys cinereus LR/lc
        - Slender Oldfield mouse, Thomasomys gracilis LR/lc
        - Paramo Oldfield mouse, Thomasomys paramorum LR/lc
        - Thomas's Oldfield mouse, Thomasomys pyrrhonotus LR/lc
        - Rhoads's Oldfield mouse, Thomasomys rhoadsi LR/lc
        - Forest Oldfield mouse, Thomasomys silvestris LR/lc

==== Order: Lagomorpha (lagomorphs) ====
The lagomorphs comprise two families, Leporidae (hares and rabbits), and Ochotonidae (pikas). Though they can resemble rodents, and were classified as a superfamily in that order until the early 20th century, they have since been considered a separate order. They differ from rodents in a number of physical characteristics, such as having four incisors in the upper jaw rather than two.

- Family: Leporidae (rabbits, hares)
  - Genus: Sylvilagus
    - Andean tapetí, Sylvilagus andinus DD
    - Common tapetí, Sylvilagus brasiliensis EN
    - Ecuadorian tapetí, Sylvilagus daulensis NE
    - Western tapetí, Sylvilagus surdaster NE

==== Order: Eulipotyphla (shrews, hedgehogs, moles, and solenodons) ====
Eulipotyphlans are insectivorous mammals. Shrews and solenodons closely resemble mice, hedgehogs carry spines, while moles are stout-bodied burrowers.

- Family: Soricidae (shrews)
  - Subfamily: Soricinae
    - Tribe: Blarinini
      - Genus: Cryptotis
        - Ecuadorean small-eared shrew, Cryptotis montivaga LR/lc
        - Scaly-footed small-eared shrew, Cryptotis squamipes LR/lc
        - Thomas' small-eared shrew, Cryptotis thomasi LR/lc

==== Order: Chiroptera (bats) ====
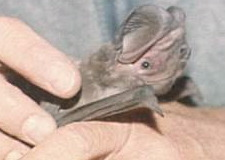
Western mastiff bat

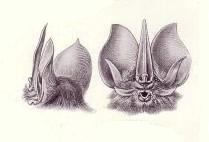
Tomes's sword-nosed bat

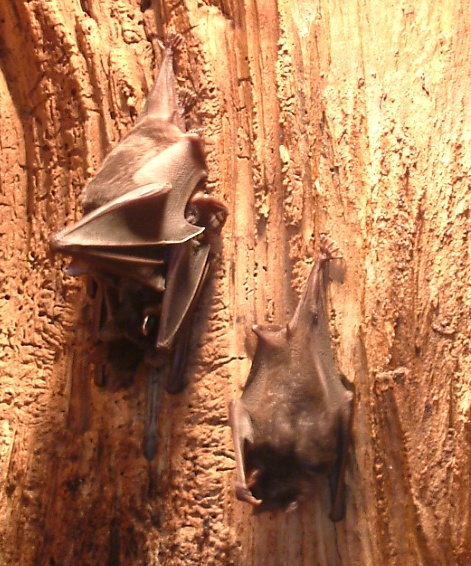
Pale spear-nosed bat

The bats' most distinguishing feature is that their forelimbs are developed as wings, making them the only mammals capable of flight. Bat species account for about 20% of all mammals.

- Family: Noctilionidae
  - Genus: Noctilio
    - Lesser bulldog bat, Noctilio albiventris LR/lc
    - Greater bulldog bat, Noctilio leporinus LR/lc
- Family: Vespertilionidae
  - Subfamily: Myotinae
    - Genus: Myotis
      - Silver-tipped myotis, Myotis albescens LR/lc
      - Hairy-legged myotis, Myotis keaysi LR/lc
      - Black myotis, Myotis nigricans LR/lc
      - Montane myotis, Myotis oxyotus LR/lc
      - Riparian myotis, Myotis riparius LR/lc
      - Velvety myotis, Myotis simus LR/lc
  - Subfamily: Vespertilioninae
    - Genus: Eptesicus
      - Little black serotine, Eptesicus andinus LR/lc
      - Brazilian brown bat, Eptesicus brasiliensis LR/lc
      - Argentine brown bat, Eptesicus furinalis LR/lc
      - Harmless serotine, Eptesicus innoxius VU
    - Genus: Histiotus
      - Small big-eared brown bat, Histiotus montanus LR/lc
    - Genus: Lasiurus
      - Desert red bat, Lasiurus blossevillii LR/lc
      - Hoary bat, Lasiurus cinereus LR/lc
      - Southern yellow bat, Lasiurus ega LR/lc
- Family: Molossidae
  - Genus: Cynomops
    - Greenhall's dog-faced bat, Cynomops greenhalli LR/lc
    - Southern dog-faced bat, Cynomops planirostris LR/lc
  - Genus: Eumops
    - Black bonneted bat, Eumops auripendulus LR/lc
    - Dwarf bonneted bat, Eumops bonariensis LR/lc
    - Wagner's bonneted bat, Eumops glaucinus LR/lc
    - Western mastiff bat, Eumops perotis LR/lc
  - Genus: Molossops
    - Equatorial dog-faced bat, Molossops aequatorianus VU
  - Genus: Molossus
    - Black mastiff bat, Molossus ater LR/lc
    - Bonda mastiff bat, Molossus bondae LR/lc
    - Velvety free-tailed bat, Molossus molossus LR/lc
  - Genus: Nyctinomops
    - Big free-tailed bat, Nyctinomops macrotis LR/lc
  - Genus: Promops
    - Big crested mastiff bat, Promops centralis LR/lc
    - Brown mastiff bat, Promops nasutus LR/lc
  - Genus: Tadarida
    - Mexican free-tailed bat, Tadarida brasiliensis LR/nt
- Family: Emballonuridae
  - Genus: Balantiopteryx
    - Ecuadorian sac-winged bat, Balantiopteryx infusca EN
  - Genus: Centronycteris
    - Shaggy bat, Centronycteris maximiliani LR/lc
  - Genus: Diclidurus
    - Northern ghost bat, Diclidurus albus LR/lc
  - Genus: Peropteryx
    - Greater dog-like bat, Peropteryx kappleri LR/lc
    - Lesser dog-like bat, Peropteryx macrotis LR/lc
  - Genus: Rhynchonycteris
    - Proboscis bat, Rhynchonycteris naso LR/lc
  - Genus: Saccopteryx
    - Greater sac-winged bat, Saccopteryx bilineata LR/lc
    - Frosted sac-winged bat, Saccopteryx canescens LR/lc
    - Lesser sac-winged bat, Saccopteryx leptura LR/lc
- Family: Mormoopidae
  - Genus: Mormoops
    - Ghost-faced bat, Mormoops megalophylla LR/lc
  - Genus: Pteronotus
    - Big naked-backed bat, Pteronotus gymnonotus LR/lc
- Family: Phyllostomidae
  - Subfamily: Phyllostominae
    - Genus: Glyphonycteris
      - Davies's big-eared bat, Glyphonycteris daviesi LR/nt
      - Tricolored big-eared bat, Glyphonycteris sylvestris LR/nt
    - Genus: Lonchorhina
      - Tomes's sword-nosed bat, Lonchorhina aurita LR/lc
    - Genus: Lophostoma
      - Pygmy round-eared bat, Lophostoma brasiliense LR/lc
      - White-throated round-eared bat, Lophostoma silvicolum LR/lc
    - Genus: Macrophyllum
      - Long-legged bat, Macrophyllum macrophyllum LR/lc
    - Genus: Micronycteris
      - Hairy big-eared bat, Micronycteris hirsuta LR/lc
      - Little big-eared bat, Micronycteris megalotis LR/lc
      - White-bellied big-eared bat, Micronycteris minuta LR/lc
    - Genus: Mimon
      - Striped hairy-nosed bat, Mimon crenulatum LR/lc
    - Genus: Phylloderma
      - Pale-faced bat, Phylloderma stenops LR/lc
    - Genus: Phyllostomus
      - Pale spear-nosed bat, Phyllostomus discolor LR/lc
      - Lesser spear-nosed bat, Phyllostomus elongatus LR/lc
      - Greater spear-nosed bat, Phyllostomus hastatus LR/lc
    - Genus: Trachops
      - Fringe-lipped bat, Trachops cirrhosus LR/lc
    - Genus: Vampyrum
      - Spectral bat, Vampyrum spectrum LR/nt
  - Subfamily: Lonchophyllinae
    - Genus: Lionycteris
      - Chestnut long-tongued bat, Lionycteris spurrelli LR/lc
    - Genus: Lonchophylla
      - Handley's nectar bat, Lonchophylla handleyi VU
      - Western nectar bat, Lonchophylla hesperia VU
      - Godman's nectar bat, Lonchophylla mordax LR/lc
      - Orange nectar bat, Lonchophylla robusta LR/lc
      - Thomas's nectar bat, Lonchophylla thomasi LR/lc
  - Subfamily: Glossophaginae
    - Genus: Anoura
      - Tailed tailless bat, Anoura caudifer LR/lc
      - Handley's tailless bat, Anoura cultrata LR/lc
      - Geoffroy's tailless bat, Anoura geoffroyi LR/lc
    - Genus: Choeroniscus
      - Minor long-nosed long-tongued bat, Choeroniscus minor LR/lc
      - Greater long-tailed bat, Choeroniscus periosus VU
    - Genus: Glossophaga
      - Commissaris's long-tongued bat, Glossophaga commissarisi LR/lc
      - Miller's long-tongued bat, Glossophaga longirostris LR/lc
      - Pallas's long-tongued bat, Glossophaga soricina LR/lc
    - Genus: Lichonycteris
      - Dark long-tongued bat, Lichonycteris obscura LR/lc
  - Subfamily: Carolliinae
    - Genus: Carollia
      - Chestnut short-tailed bat, Carollia castanea LR/lc
      - Seba's short-tailed bat, Carollia perspicillata LR/lc
    - Genus: Rhinophylla
      - Hairy little fruit bat, Rhinophylla alethina LR/nt
      - Fischer's little fruit bat, Rhinophylla fischerae LR/nt
      - Dwarf little fruit bat, Rhinophylla pumilio LR/lc
  - Subfamily: Stenodermatinae
    - Genus: Artibeus
      - Andersen's fruit-eating bat, Artibeus anderseni LR/lc
      - Fraternal fruit-eating bat, Artibeus fraterculus VU
      - Silver fruit-eating bat, Artibeus glaucus LR/lc
      - Jamaican fruit bat, Artibeus jamaicensis LR/lc
      - Great fruit-eating bat, Artibeus lituratus LR/lc
      - Dark fruit-eating bat, Artibeus obscurus LR/nt
      - Pygmy fruit-eating bat, Artibeus phaeotis LR/lc
      - Toltec fruit-eating bat, Artibeus toltecus LR/lc
    - Genus: Chiroderma
      - Salvin's big-eyed bat, Chiroderma salvini LR/lc
      - Little big-eyed bat, Chiroderma trinitatum LR/lc
      - Hairy big-eyed bat, Chiroderma villosum LR/lc
    - Genus: Enchisthenes
      - Velvety fruit-eating bat, Enchisthenes hartii LR/lc
    - Genus: Mesophylla
      - MacConnell's bat, Mesophylla macconnelli LR/lc
    - Genus: Sturnira
      - Aratathomas's yellow-shouldered bat, Sturnira aratathomasi LR/nt
      - Bidentate yellow-shouldered bat, Sturnira bidens LR/nt
      - Bogota yellow-shouldered bat, Sturnira bogotensis LR/lc
      - Hairy yellow-shouldered bat, Sturnira erythromos LR/lc
      - Highland yellow-shouldered bat, Sturnira ludovici LR/lc
      - Louis's yellow-shouldered bat, Sturnira luisi LR/lc
      - Greater yellow-shouldered bat, Sturnira magna LR/nt
      - Tilda's yellow-shouldered bat, Sturnira tildae LR/lc
    - Genus: Uroderma
      - Tent-making bat, Uroderma bilobatum LR/lc
      - Brown tent-making bat, Uroderma magnirostrum LR/lc
    - Genus: Vampyressa
      - Striped yellow-eared bat, Vampyressa nymphaea LR/lc
      - Southern little yellow-eared bat, Vampyressa pusilla LR/lc
    - Genus: Platyrrhinus
      - Short-headed broad-nosed bat, Platyrrhinus brachycephalus LR/lc
      - Thomas's broad-nosed bat, Platyrrhinus dorsalis LR/lc
      - Heller's broad-nosed bat, Platyrrhinus helleri LR/lc
      - Buffy broad-nosed bat, Platyrrhinus infuscus LR/nt
      - Greater broad-nosed bat, Platyrrhinus vittatus LR/lc
  - Subfamily: Desmodontinae
    - Genus: Desmodus
      - Common vampire bat, Desmodus rotundus LR/lc
    - Genus: Diaemus
      - White-winged vampire bat, Diaemus youngi LR/lc
    - Genus: Diphylla
      - Hairy-legged vampire bat, Diphylla ecaudata LR/nt
- Family: Furipteridae
  - Genus: Amorphochilus
    - Smokey bat, Amorphochilus schnablii VU
  - Genus: Furipterus
    - Furipteridae, Furipterus horrens LR/lc
- Family: Thyropteridae
  - Genus: Thyroptera
    - Peters's disk-winged bat, Thyroptera discifera LR/lc
    - Spix's disk-winged bat, Thyroptera tricolor LR/lc

==== Order: Cetacea (whales) ====
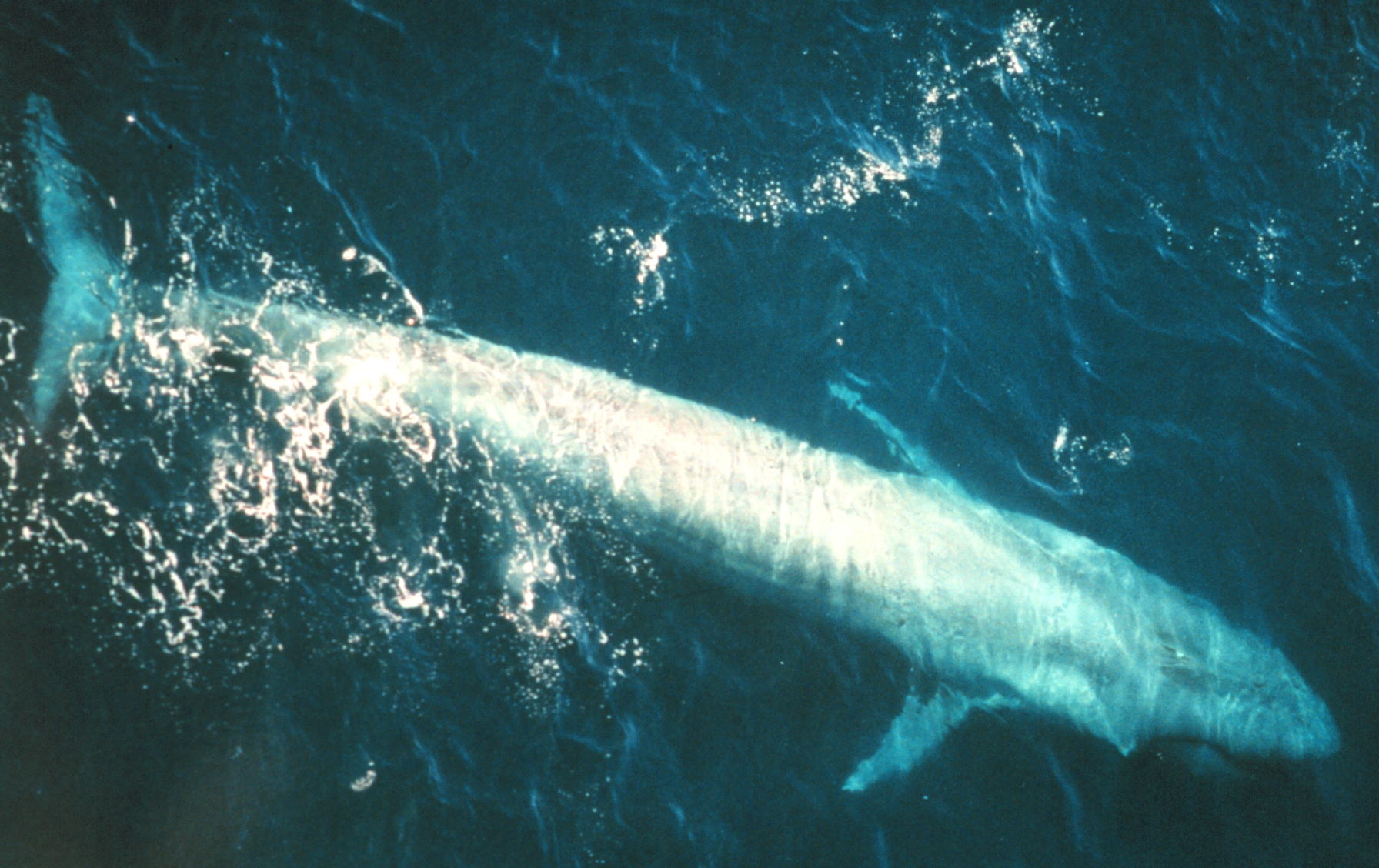
Blue whale

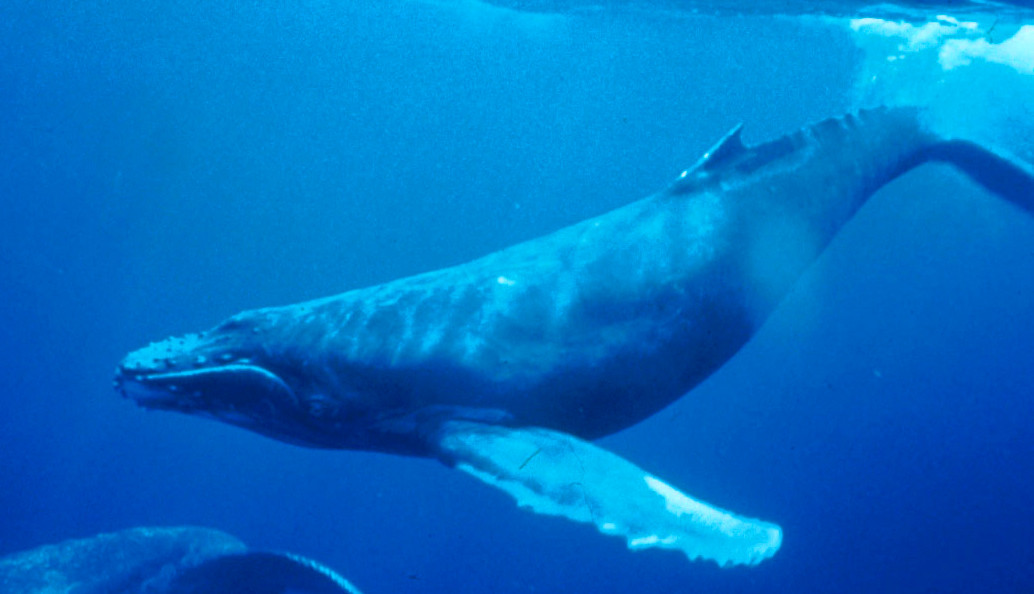
Humpback whale

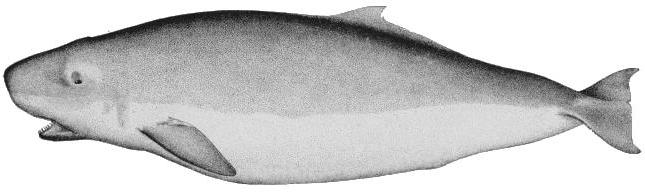
Pygmy sperm whale

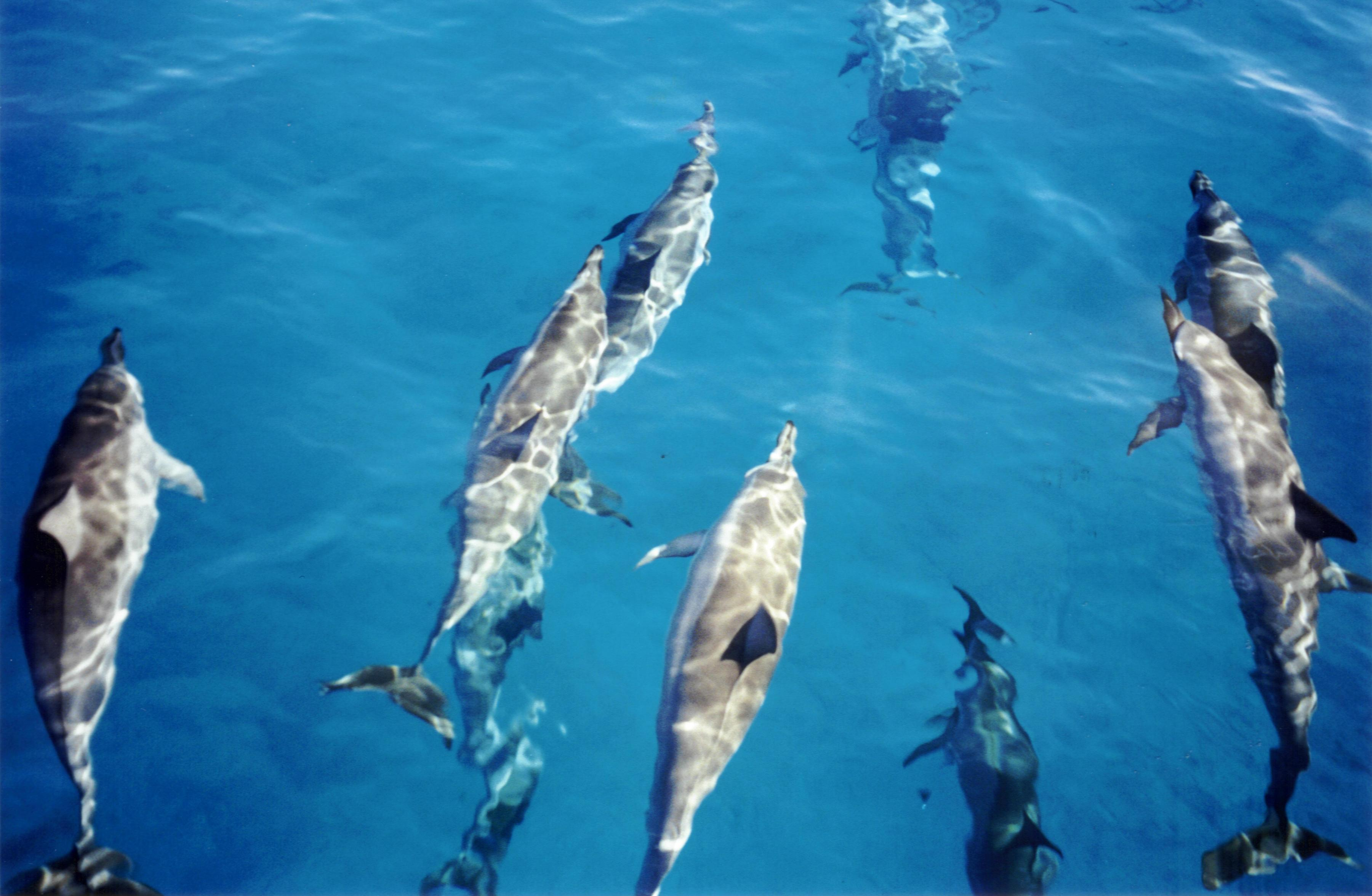
Spinner dolphins

Orcas

The order Cetacea includes whales, dolphins and porpoises. They are the mammals most fully adapted to aquatic life with a spindle-shaped nearly hairless body, protected by a thick layer of blubber, and forelimbs and tail modified to provide propulsion underwater.

- Suborder: Mysticeti
  - Family: Balaenopteridae
    - Subfamily: Balaenopterinae
      - Genus: Balaenoptera
        - Southern minke whale, Balaenoptera bonaerensis LR/nt
        - Bryde's whale, Balaenoptera edeni DD
        - Southern sei whale, Balaenoptera borealis schlegelii EN
        - Southern fin whale, Balaenoptera physalus quoyi EN
        - Southern blue whale, Balaenoptera musculus intermedia EN
    - Subfamily: Megapterinae
      - Genus: Megaptera
        - Southern humpback whale, Megaptera novaeangliae VU
- Suborder: Odontoceti
  - Family: Kogiidae
    - Genus: Kogia
      - Pygmy sperm whale, Kogia breviceps LR/lc
      - Dwarf sperm whale, Kogia sima LR/lc
  - Family: Ziphidae
    - Genus: Ziphius
      - Cuvier's beaked whale, Ziphius cavirostris DD
    - Subfamily: Hyperoodontinae
      - Genus: Mesoplodon
        - Blainville's beaked whale, Mesoplodon densirostris DD
        - Ginkgo-toothed beaked whale, Mesoplodon ginkgodens DD
        - Pygmy beaked whale, Mesoplodon peruvianus DD
  - Family: Delphinidae (marine dolphins)
    - Genus: Steno
      - Rough-toothed dolphin, Steno bredanensis DD
    - Genus: Sotalia
      - Tucuxi, Sotalia fluviatilis DD
    - Genus: Stenella
      - Spinner dolphin, Stenella longirostris LR/cd
    - Genus: Delphinus
      - Short-beaked common dolphin, Delphinus delphis LR/lc
    - Genus: Lagenodelphis
      - Fraser's dolphin, Lagenodelphis hosei DD
  - Superfamily: Platanistoidea
    - Family: Iniidae
      - Genus: Inia
        - Boto, Inia geoffrensis VU
    - Genus: Feresa
      - Pygmy killer whale, Feresa attenuata DD
    - Genus: Pseudorca
      - False killer whale, Pseudorca crassidens LR/lc
    - Genus: Globicephala
      - Short-finned pilot whale, Globicephala macrorhynchus LR/cd
    - Genus: Orcinus
      - Orca, Orcinus orca LR/cd

==== Order: Carnivora (carnivorans) ====
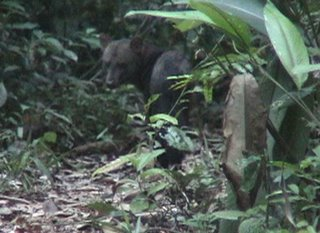
Short-eared dog

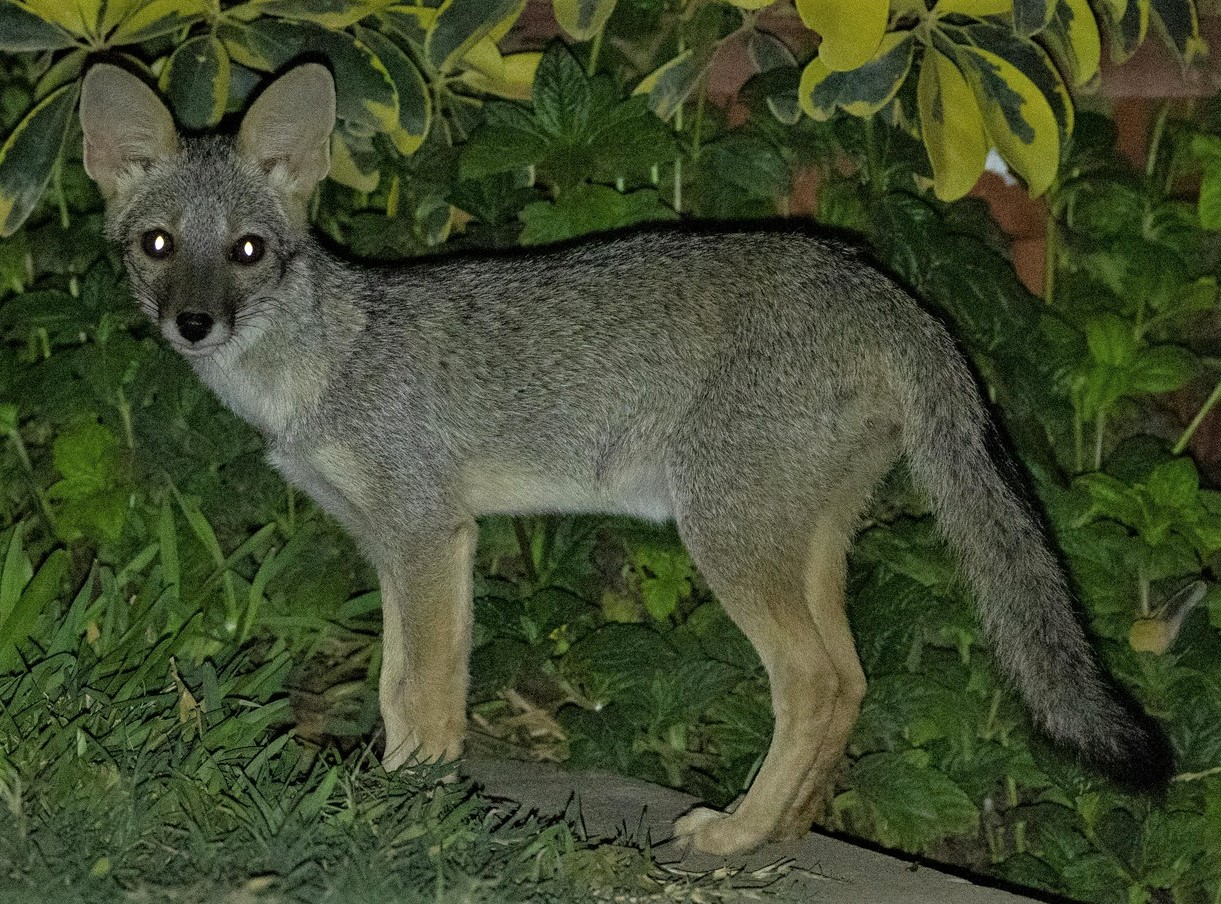
Sechura fox

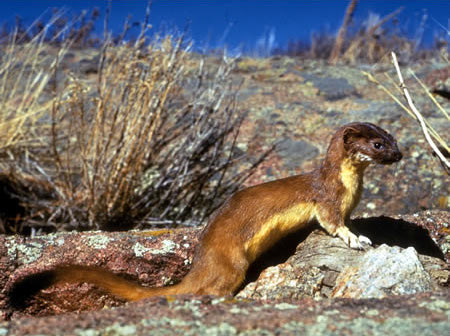
Long-tailed weasel

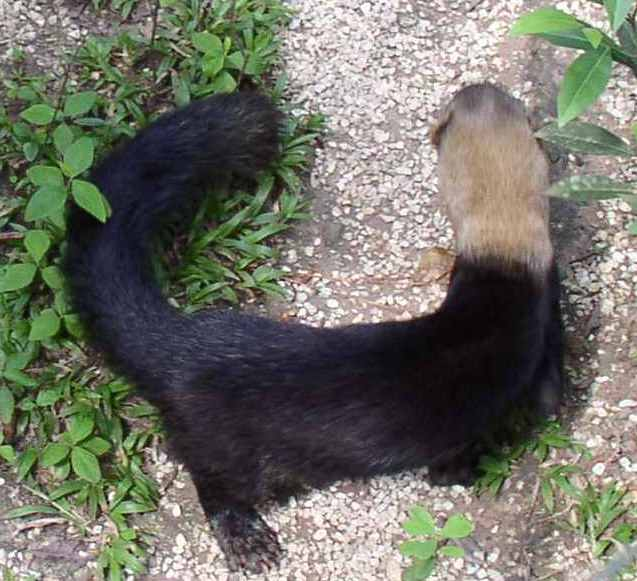
Tayra

Carnivorans include over 260 species, the majority of which eat meat as their primary dietary item. They have a characteristic skull shape and dentition.

- Suborder: Feliformia
  - Family: Felidae (cats)
    - Subfamily: Felinae
      - Genus: Leopardus
        - Pampas cat, L. colocola NT
        - Ocelot, L. pardalis LC
        - Oncilla, L. tigrinus VU
        - Margay, L. wiedii NT
      - Genus: Puma
        - Cougar, P. concolor LC
      - Genus: Herpailurus
        - Jaguarundi, H. yagouaroundi LC
    - Subfamily: Pantherinae
      - Genus: Panthera
        - Jaguar, P. onca NT
- Suborder: Caniformia
  - Family: Canidae (dogs, foxes)
    - Genus: Lycalopex
      - Culpeo, Lycalopex culpaeus LC
      - South American gray fox, Lycalopex griseus LC
      - Sechura fox, Lycalopex sechurae DD
    - Genus: Atelocynus
      - Short-eared dog, Atelocynus microtis DD
    - Genus: Speothos
      - Bush dog, Speothos venaticus VU
  - Family: Ursidae (bears)
    - Genus: Tremarctos
      - Spectacled bear, Tremarctos ornatus VU
  - Family: Procyonidae (raccoons)
    - Genus: Procyon
      - Crab-eating raccoon, Procyon cancrivorus
    - Genus: Nasua
      - South American coati, Nasua nasua
    - Genus: Nasuella
      - Mountain coati, Nasuella olivacea DD
    - Genus: Potos
      - Kinkajou, Potos flavus
    - Genus: Bassaricyon
      - Western lowland olingo, Bassaricyon medius
      - Northern olingo, Bassaricyon gabbii
      - Olinguito, Bassaricyon neblina
  - Family: Mustelidae (mustelids)
    - Genus: Eira
      - Tayra, Eira barbara
    - Genus: Galictis
      - Greater grison, Galictis vittata
    - Genus: Lontra
      - Neotropical river otter, Lontra longicaudis DD
    - Genus: Neogale
      - Amazon weasel, Neogale africana DD
      - Colombian weasel, Neogale felipei EN
      - Long-tailed weasel, Neogale frenata
    - Genus: Pteronura
      - Giant otter, Pteronura brasiliensis EN
  - Family: Otariidae (eared seals, sealions)
    - Genus: Arctocephalus
      - Galapagos fur seal, Arctocephalus galapagoensis VU
    - Genus: Zalophus
      - Galápagos sea lion, Zalophus wollebaeki VU
    - Family: Phocidae (earless seals)
      - Genus: Mirounga
        - Southern elephant seal, M. leonina LC vagrant
  - Family: Mephitidae
    - Genus: Conepatus
      - Striped hog-nosed skunk, Conepatus semistriatus

==== Order: Perissodactyla (odd-toed ungulates) ====
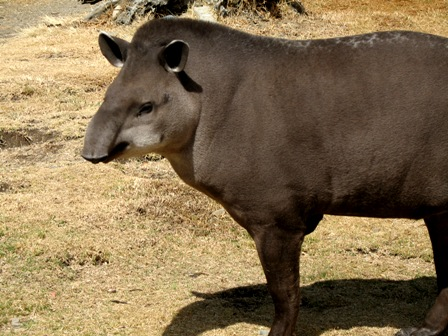
Brazilian tapir

The odd-toed ungulates are browsing and grazing mammals. They are usually large to very large, and have relatively simple stomachs and a large middle toe.

- Family: Tapiridae (tapirs)
  - Genus: Tapirus
    - Baird's tapir, Tapirus bairdii EN
    - Mountain tapir, Tapirus pinchaque EN
    - Brazilian tapir, Tapirus terrestris VU

==== Order: Artiodactyla (even-toed ungulates) ====
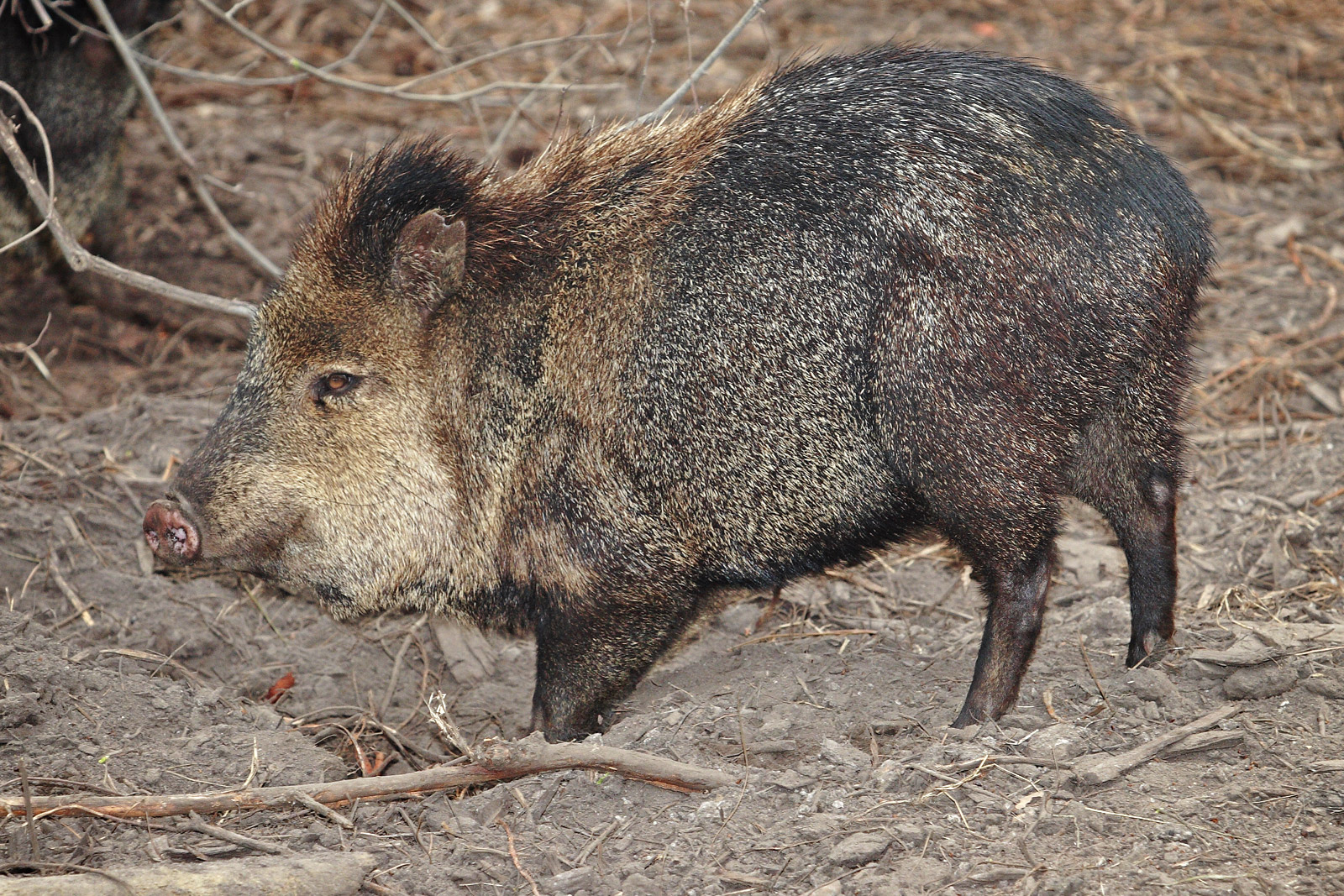
Collared peccary

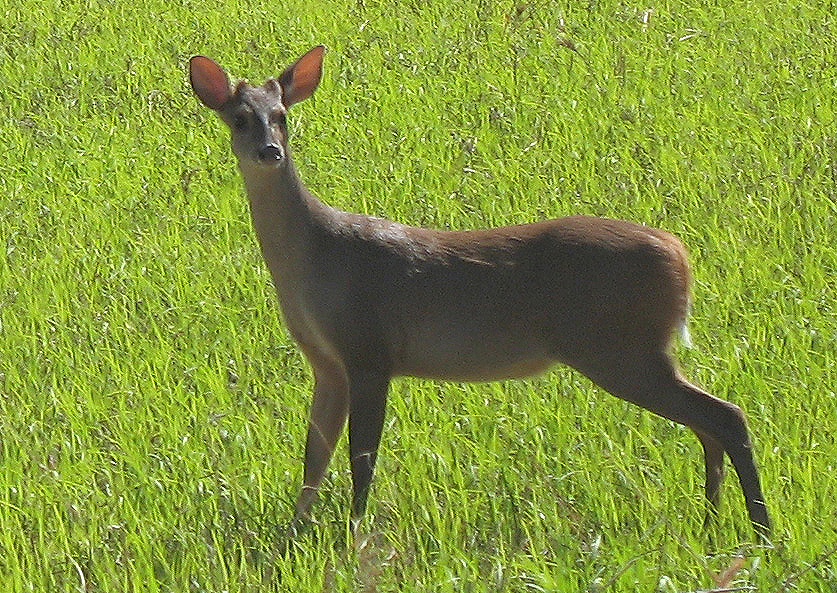
Red brocket

The even-toed ungulates are ungulates whose weight is borne about equally by the third and fourth toes, rather than mostly or entirely by the third as in perissodactyls. There are about 220 artiodactyl species, including many that are of great economic importance to humans.

- Family: Tayassuidae (peccaries)
  - Genus: Dicotyles
    - Collared peccary, Dicotyles tajacu LC
  - Genus: Tayassu
    - White-lipped peccary, Tayassu pecari NT
- Family: Camelidae (camels, llamas)
  - Genus: Lama
    - Guanaco, L. guanicoe LC extirpated
    - Vicuña, L. vicugna LC introduced
- Family: Cervidae (deer)
  - Subfamily: Capreolinae
    - Genus: Hippocamelus
      - Taruca, Hippocamelus antisensis DD
    - Genus: Mazama
      - Red brocket, Mazama americana DD
      - Gray brocket, Mazama gouazoupira DD
      - Little red brocket, Mazama rufina LR/nt
    - Genus: Odocoileus
      - White-tailed deer, Odocoileus virginianus LR/lc
    - Genus: Pudu
      - Northern pudú, Pudu mephistophiles LR/nt

=== Infraclass: Metatheria ===
==== Order: Didelphimorphia (common opossums) ====
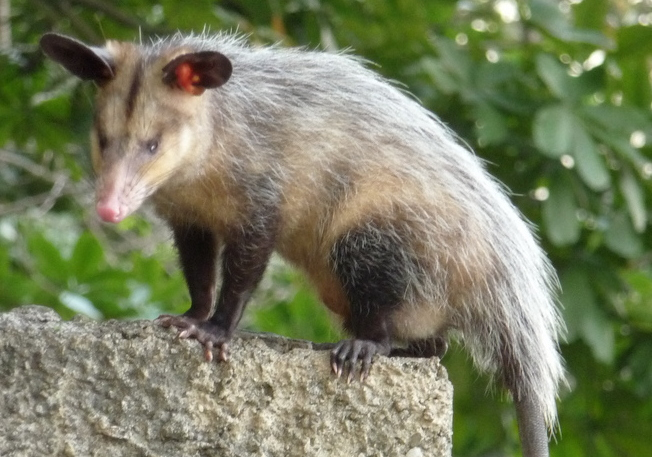
Common opossum

Didelphimorphia is the order of common opossums of the Western Hemisphere. Opossums probably diverged from the basic South American marsupials in the late Cretaceous or early Paleocene. They are small to medium-sized marsupials, about the size of a large house cat, with a long snout and prehensile tail.

- Family: Didelphidae (American opossums)
  - Subfamily: Caluromyinae
    - Genus: Caluromys
      - Derby's woolly opossum, Caluromys derbianus VU
      - Brown-eared woolly opossum, Caluromys lanatus LR/nt
    - Genus: Glironia
      - Bushy-tailed opossum, Glironia venusta VU
  - Subfamily: Didelphinae
    - Genus: Chironectes
      - Water opossum, Chironectes minimus LR/nt
    - Genus: Didelphis
      - White-eared opossum, Didelphis albiventris LR/lc
      - Common opossum, Didelphis marsupialis LR/lc
    - Genus: Marmosa
      - Rufous mouse opossum, Marmosa lepida LR/nt
      - Linnaeus's mouse opossum, Marmosa murina LR/lc
      - Bare-tailed woolly mouse opossum, Marmosa regina LR/lc
      - Robinson's mouse opossum, Marmosa robinsoni LR/lc
      - Red mouse opossum, Marmosa rubra LR/lc
    - Genus: Marmosops
      - Tschudi's slender opossum, Marmosops impavidus LR/nt
      - White-bellied slender opossum, Marmosops noctivagus LR/lc
    - Genus: Metachirus
      - Brown four-eyed opossum, Metachirus nudicaudatus LR/lc
    - Genus: Monodelphis
      - Sepia short-tailed opossum, Monodelphis adusta LR/lc
    - Genus: Philander
      - Anderson's four-eyed opossum, Philander andersoni LR/lc
      - Gray four-eyed opossum, Philander opossum LR/lc

==== Order: Paucituberculata (shrew opossums) ====
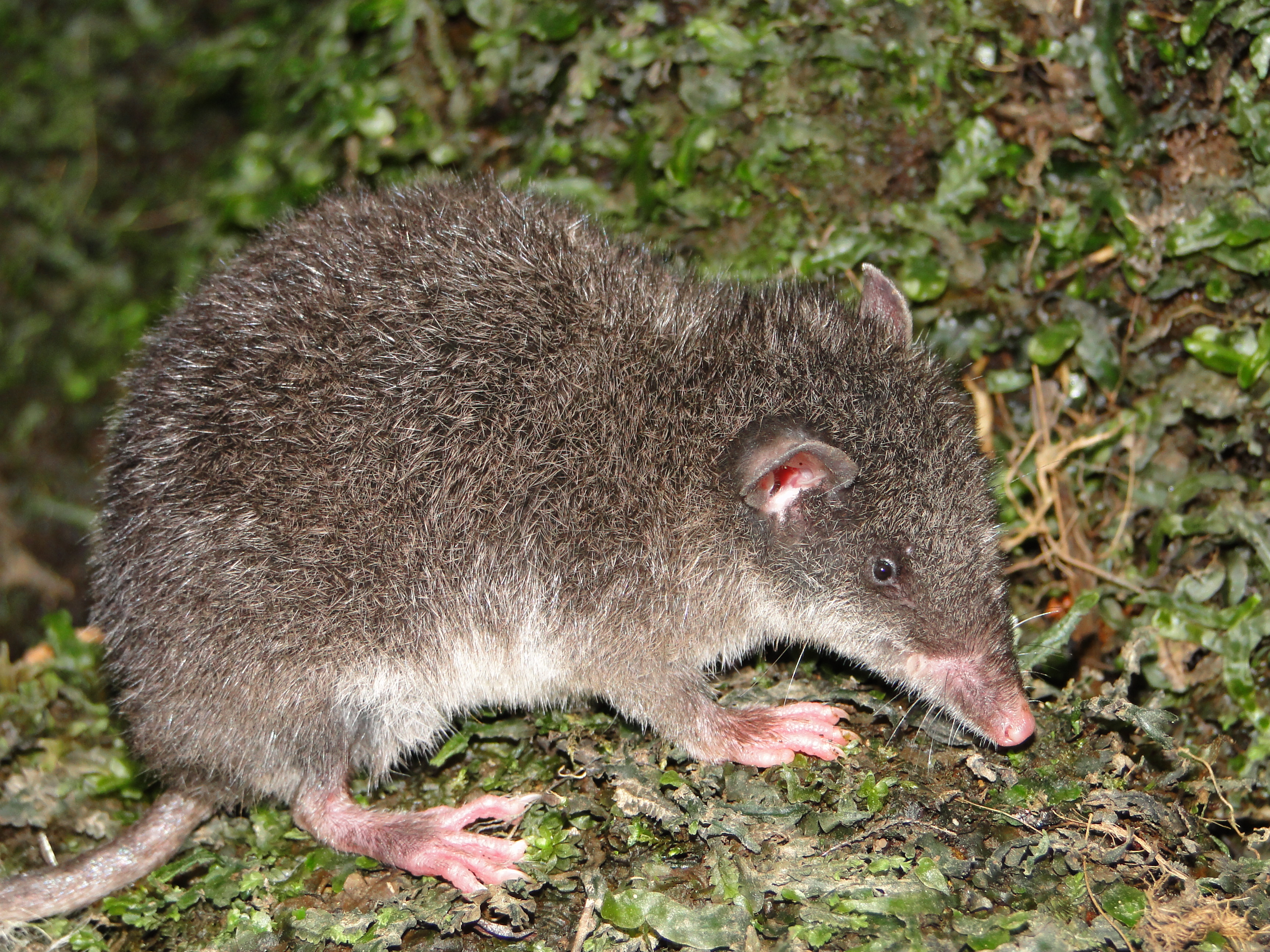
Eastern caenolestid

There are six extant species of shrew opossum. They are small shrew-like marsupials confined to the Andes.

- Family: Caenolestidae
  - Genus: Caenolestes
    - Gray-bellied caenolestid, Caenolestes caniventer NT
    - Andean caenolestid, Caenolestes condorensis VU
    - Northern caenolestid, Caenolestes convelatus VU
    - Dusky caenolestid, Caenolestes fuliginosus LC
    - Eastern caenolestid, Caenolestes sangay VU

== See also ==
- List of chordate orders
- List of prehistoric mammals
- Lists of mammals by region
- Mammal classification
- List of mammals described in the 2000s
