= Lonchophylla orienticollina =

Conservation status
- Data Deficient (IUCN 3.1)

Scientific classification
- Kingdom: Animalia
- Phylum: Chordata
- Class: Mammalia
- Order: Chiroptera
- Family: Phyllostomidae
- Genus: Lonchophylla
- Species: L. orienticollina

Binomial name
- Lonchophylla orienticollina Dávalos & Corthals, 2008

Species of bat

Lonchophylla orienticollina is a species of bat found in Colombia, Venezuela, and Ecuador.

== Taxonomy ==
L. orienticollina was described as a new species in 2008 by Dávalos and Corthals. The holotype had been collected in 1988 near San Juan de Arama in Colombia. Its species name "orienticollina" is from Latin oriens meaning "eastern" and collis meaning "hill", referencing its distribution along the eastern Andes.

== Description ==
L. orienticollina is a medium-sized member of its genus, with individuals weighing 11–16 g (0.39–0.56 oz). It has a forearm length of 40–47 mm (1.6–1.9 in). The fur on its back varies in color, ranging from an intense orange to brown. Its belly fur is tawny olive in color. It is extremely similar in appearance to the orange nectar bat (Lonchophylla robusta) and Handley's nectar bat (Lonchophylla handleyi), sympatric members of its genus.

== Range and habitat ==
L. orienticollina is found in several countries in northern South America, including Colombia, Ecuador, and Venezuela. It has been documented at a range of elevations from 75–2,013 m (246–6,604 ft) above sea level. Its habitat includes old-growth forest, as well as fragmented forest.

== Conservation ==
As of 2019, it is evaluated as a data deficient species by the IUCN because its ecological requirements are not yet known.
