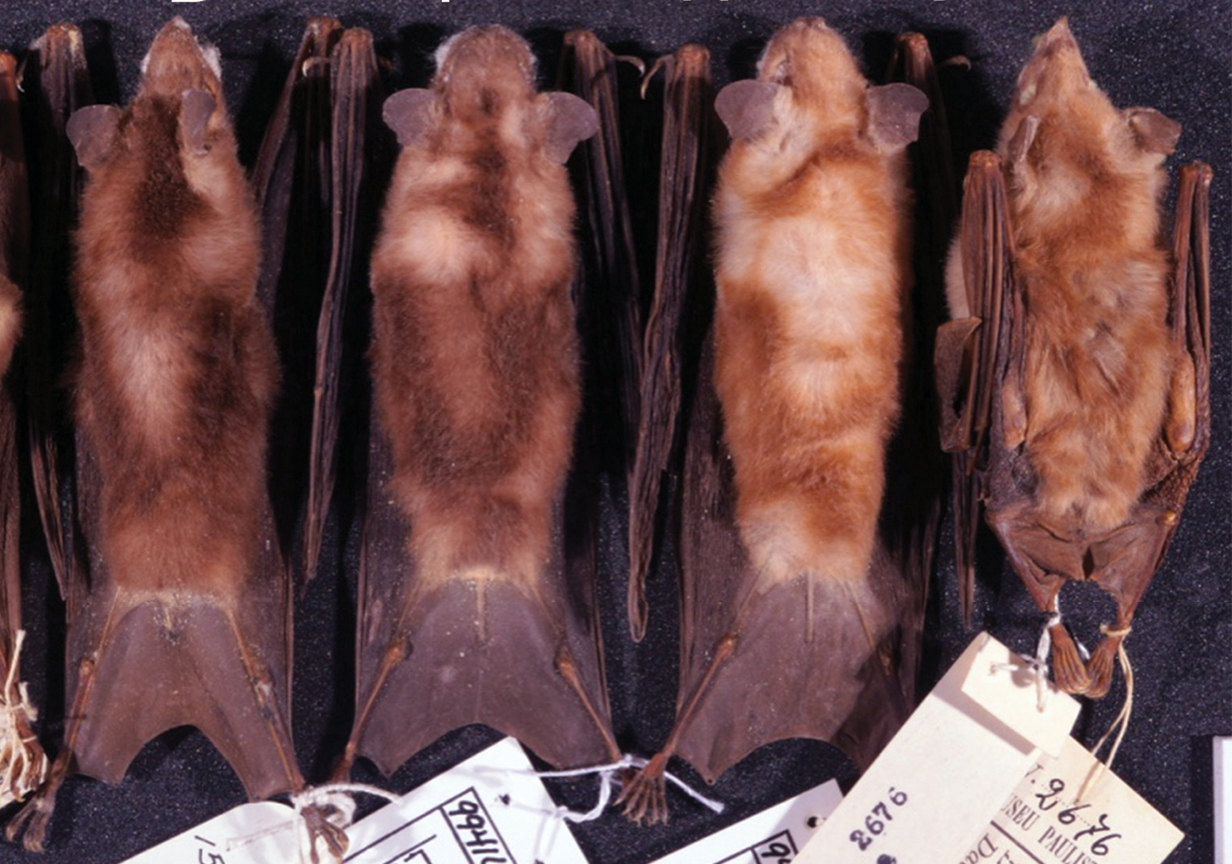
- Museum specimens

Scientific classification
- Domain: Eukaryota
- Kingdom: Animalia
- Phylum: Chordata
- Class: Mammalia
- Order: Chiroptera
- Family: Phyllostomidae
- Genus: Lonchophylla
- Species: L. inexpectata

Binomial name
- Lonchophylla inexpectata Moratelli & Dias, 2015

= Lonchophylla inexpectata =

Species of bat

Lonchophylla inexpectata is a species of leaf-nosed bat found in Brazil.
