= Lonchophylla concava =

Conservation status
- Least Concern (IUCN 3.1)

Scientific classification
- Kingdom: Animalia
- Phylum: Chordata
- Class: Mammalia
- Order: Chiroptera
- Family: Phyllostomidae
- Genus: Lonchophylla
- Species: L. concava

Binomial name
- Lonchophylla concava Goldman, 1914

Species of bat

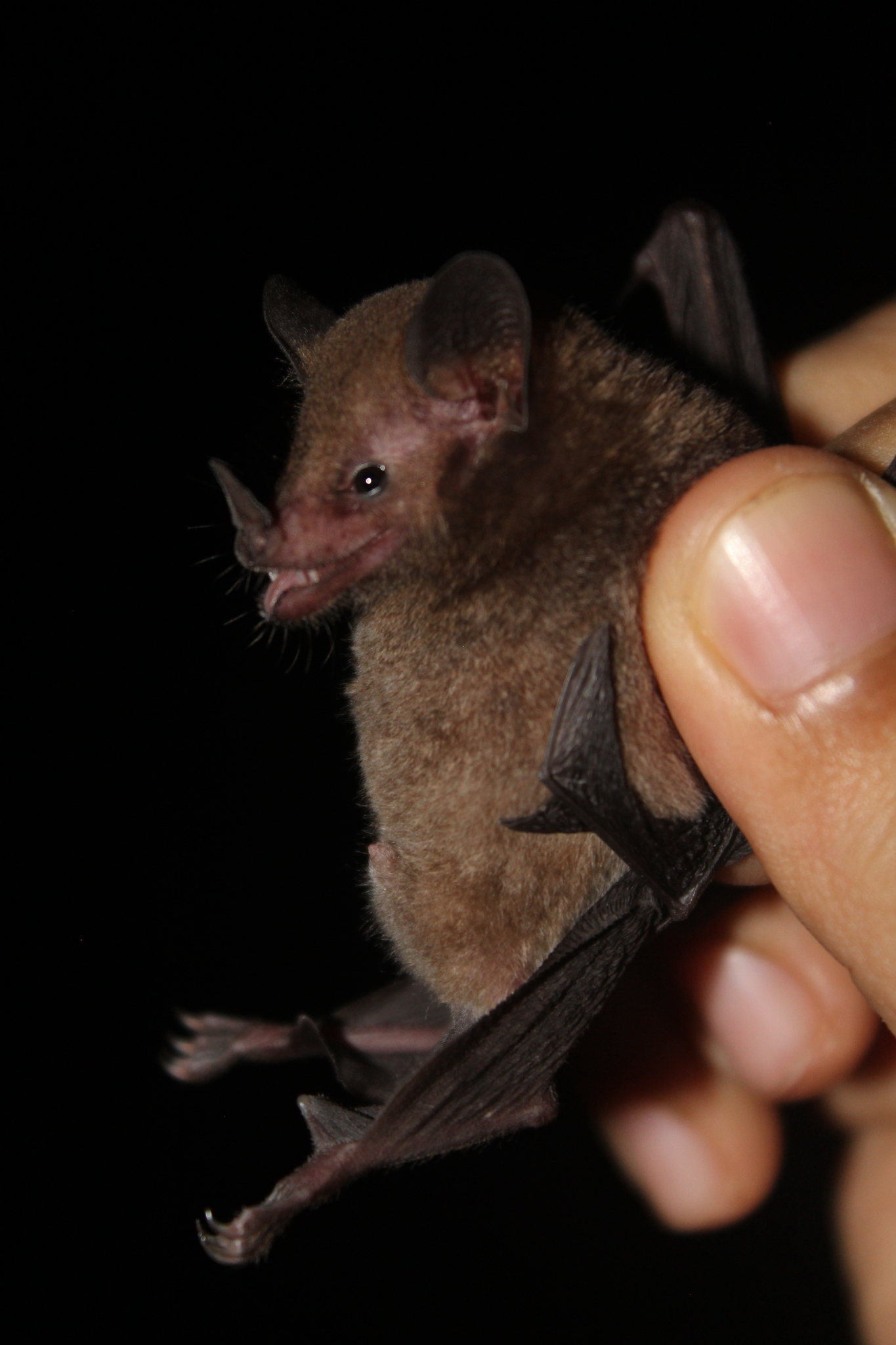
Goldman's Nectar Bat in Panama

Lonchophylla concava is a species of leaf-nosed bat found in Central and South America. It was long considered a synonym of Goldman's nectar bat, though is now recognized as distinct. It consumes nectar and pollen.

== Taxonomy ==
Lonchophylla concava was described as a new species in 1914 by Edward Alphonso Goldman. Goldman had collected the holotype from eastern Panama in 1912. In 1966, Handley published that L. concava was a synonym of Goldman's nectar bat (L. mordax); this was maintained until a 2005 publication asserted that there were major physical difference between the two taxa, and thus L. concava should be recognized as a separate species.

== Description ==
Lonchophylla concava has a forearm length of 32.0–34.6 mm (1.26–1.36 in). Females weight 7.0–8.0 g (0.25–0.28 oz) while males weigh 7.0–9.0 g (0.25–0.32 oz).

== Biology and ecology ==
Lonchophylla concava is nectarivorous and palynivorous, consuming the nectar and pollen of Mucuna and banana plants. It also consumes some butterflies and moths. During the day, it roosts in caves.

== Range and habitat ==
Lonchophylla concava is found in Central American and South America, including Costa Rica, Panama, Colombia, and Ecuador. It has been documented at a range of elevations from 0–1,000 m (0–3,281 ft) above sea level.
