= Lonchophylla fornicata =

Conservation status
- Data Deficient (IUCN 3.1)

Scientific classification
- Kingdom: Animalia
- Phylum: Chordata
- Class: Mammalia
- Order: Chiroptera
- Family: Phyllostomidae
- Genus: Lonchophylla
- Species: L. fornicata

Binomial name
- Lonchophylla fornicata Woodman, 2007

Species of bat

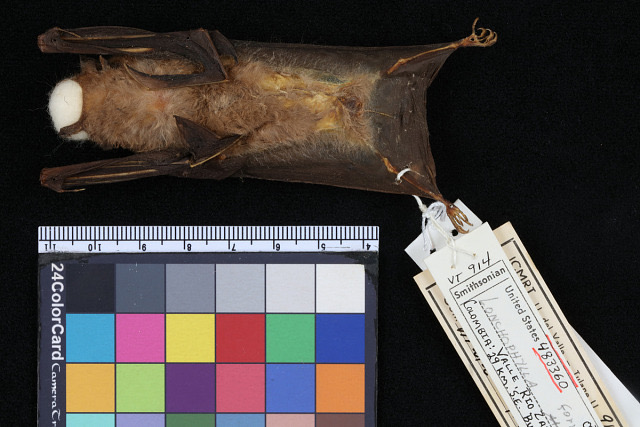
Lonchophylla fornicata

Lonchophylla fornicata is a species of bat found in South America.

== Taxonomy ==
Lonchophylla fornicata was described as a new species in 2007 by Neal Woodman. Woodman suggested the common name of "Pacific forest long-tongued bat". The holotype had been collected in 1966 29 km (18 mi) southeast of Buenaventura, Colombia by Maurice Earl. The species name fornicata is from Latin meaning "arched"; the name was chosen to allude to its similarity to another species, Lonchophylla concava.

== Description ==
It has a forearm length ranging from 34.2–35.6 mm (1.35–1.40 in).

== Range and habitat ==
It is native to South America where its range includes Colombia and Ecuador. It has been documented at a range of elevations from 75–512 m (246–1,680 ft) above sea level. As of 2019, it has only been observed in humid forests on the Pacific-facing slopes of the Andes.

== Conservation ==
As of 2019, it is listed as a data deficient species by the IUCN because its ecological requirements are poorly understood.
