= Peracchi's nectar bat =

Scientific classification
- Kingdom: Animalia
- Phylum: Chordata
- Class: Mammalia
- Order: Chiroptera
- Family: Phyllostomidae
- Genus: Lonchophylla
- Species: L. peracchii

Binomial name
- Lonchophylla peracchii Días et al., 2013
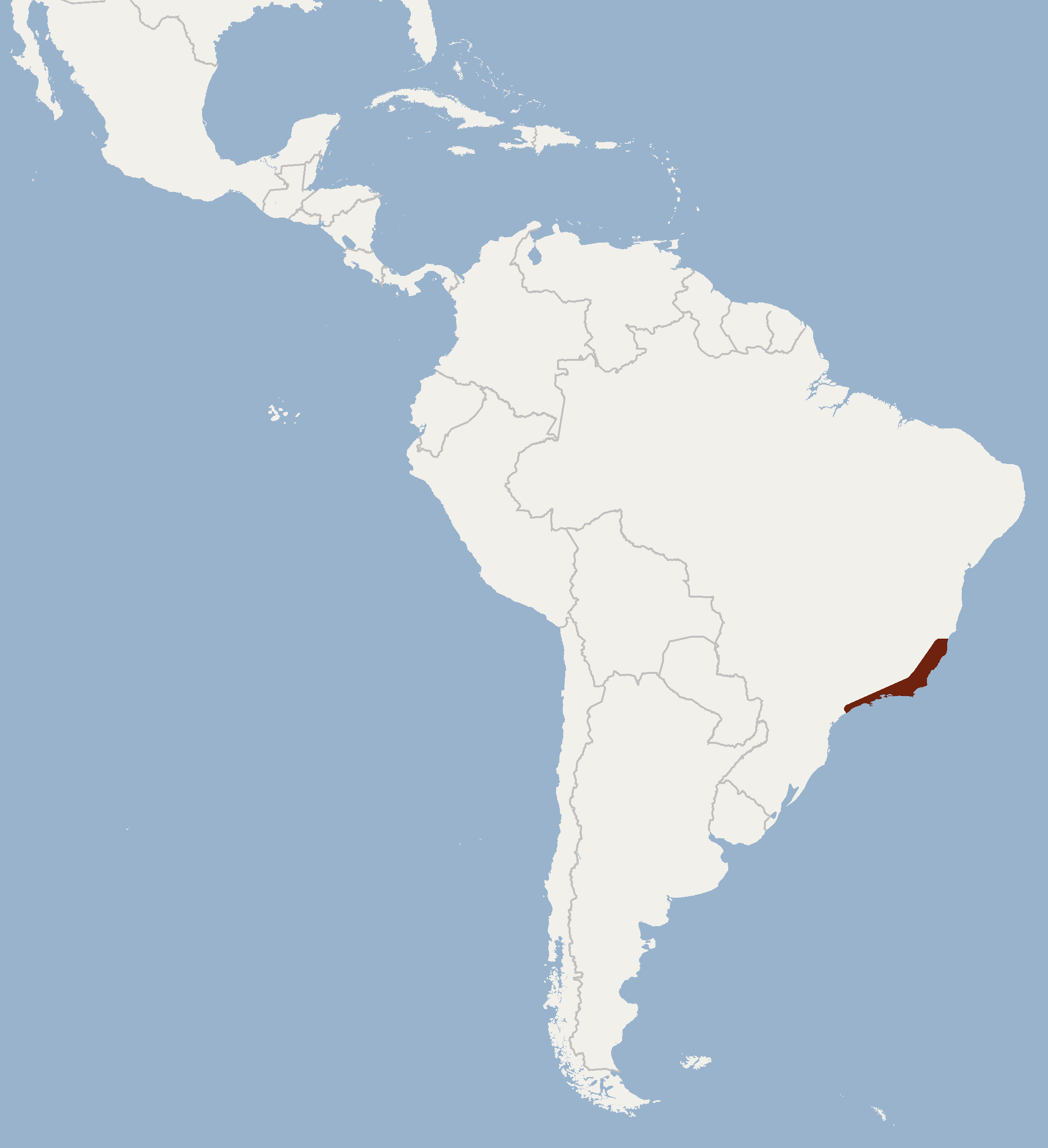

Species of bat

Peracchi's nectar bat (Lonchophylla peracchii) is a species of nectar-feeding bat in the family Phyllostomidae. It was first described from the Atlantic Forest in southeastern Brazil.

== Description ==
The discovery of this species as distinct from Lonchophylla bokermanni has meant that the latter is restricted to a small area of the Cerrado, and might be endangered due to habitat destruction.

Bat species in the genus Lonchophylla feed on nectar and differ from fruit-eating bats by having a long, extensible tongues and elongated skulls and muzzles, adapted to their feeding behaviour. L. peracchii is distinguished from L. bokermanni by its fur color and ear shape; the Cerrado species has a grayer hue and shorter, rounder ears.
