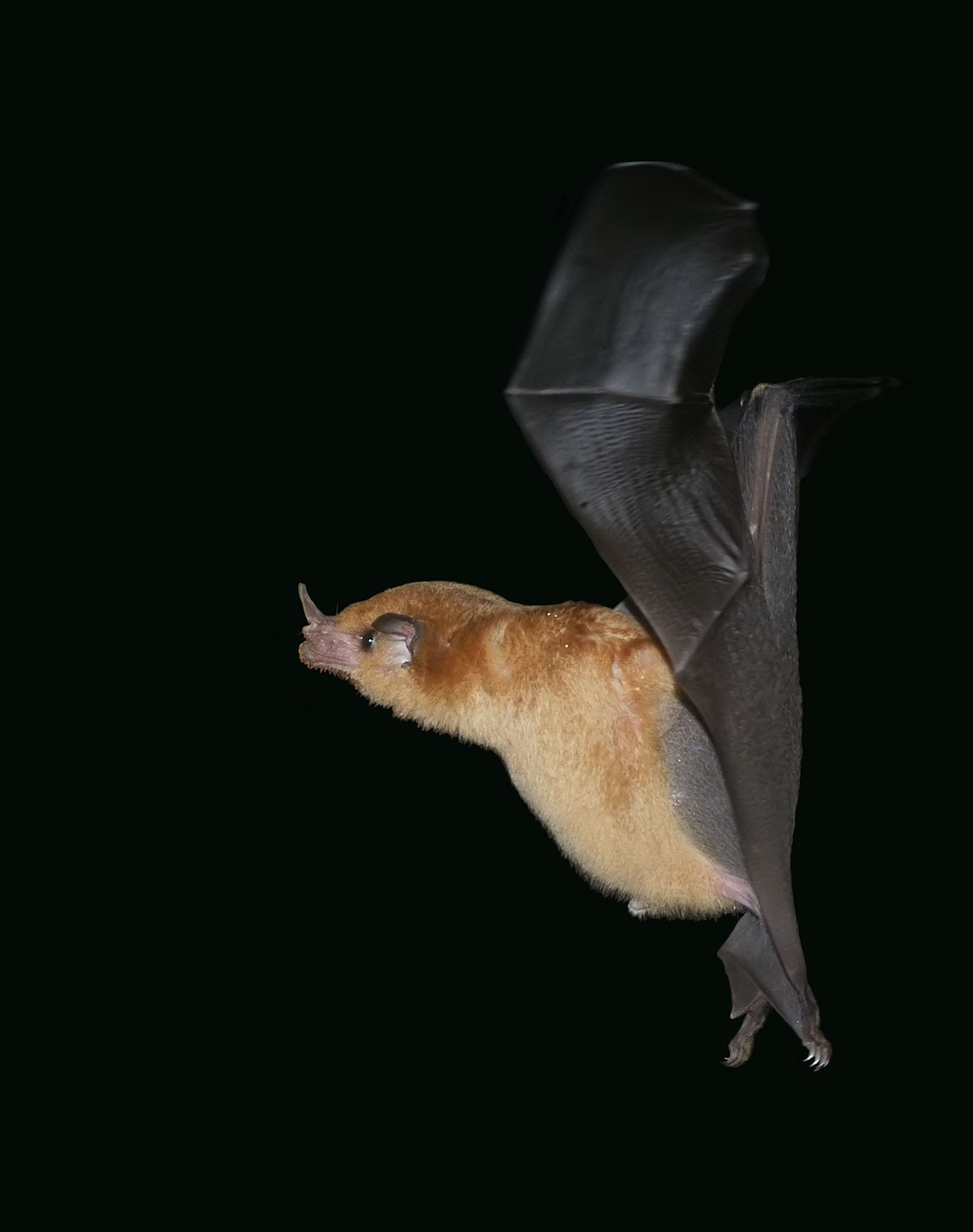
- Orange nectar bat (Lonchophylla robusta)

Scientific classification
- Domain: Eukaryota
- Kingdom: Animalia
- Phylum: Chordata
- Class: Mammalia
- Order: Chiroptera
- Family: Phyllostomidae
- Subfamily: Lonchophyllinae
- Genus: Lonchophylla; Thomas, 1903

Type species
- Lonchophylla mordax Thomas, 1903

Species
- Lonchophylla bokermanni Lonchophylla chocoana Lonchophylla concava Lonchophylla dekeyseri Lonchophylla fornicata Lonchophylla handleyi Lonchophylla hesperia Lonchophylla inexpectata Lonchophylla mordax Lonchophylla orcesi Lonchophylla orienticollina Lonchophylla peracchii Lonchophylla robusta

= Lonchophylla =

Genus of bats

Lonchophylla is a genus of bats in the family Phyllostomidae.

== List of species ==
Genus Lonchophylla

- Bokermann's nectar bat, Lonchophylla bokermanni
- Chocoan long-tongued bat, Lonchophylla chocoana
- Dekeyser's nectar bat, Lonchophylla dekeyseri
- Arched nectar bat, Lonchophylla fornicata
- Handley's nectar bat, Lonchophylla handleyi
- Western nectar bat, Lonchophylla hesperia
- Unexpected nectar bat, Lonchophylla inexpectata
- Goldman's nectar bat, Lonchophylla mordax
- Orcés's long-tongued bat, Lonchophylla orcesi
- Eastern Cordilleran nectar bat, Lonchophylla orienticollina
- Peracchi's nectar bat, Lonchophylla peracchii
- Orange nectar bat, Lonchophylla robusta
