= Bokermann's nectar bat =

Conservation status
- Endangered (IUCN 3.1)

Scientific classification
- Kingdom: Animalia
- Phylum: Chordata
- Class: Mammalia
- Order: Chiroptera
- Family: Phyllostomidae
- Genus: Lonchophylla
- Species: L. bokermanni

Binomial name
- Lonchophylla bokermanni Sazima et al., 1978
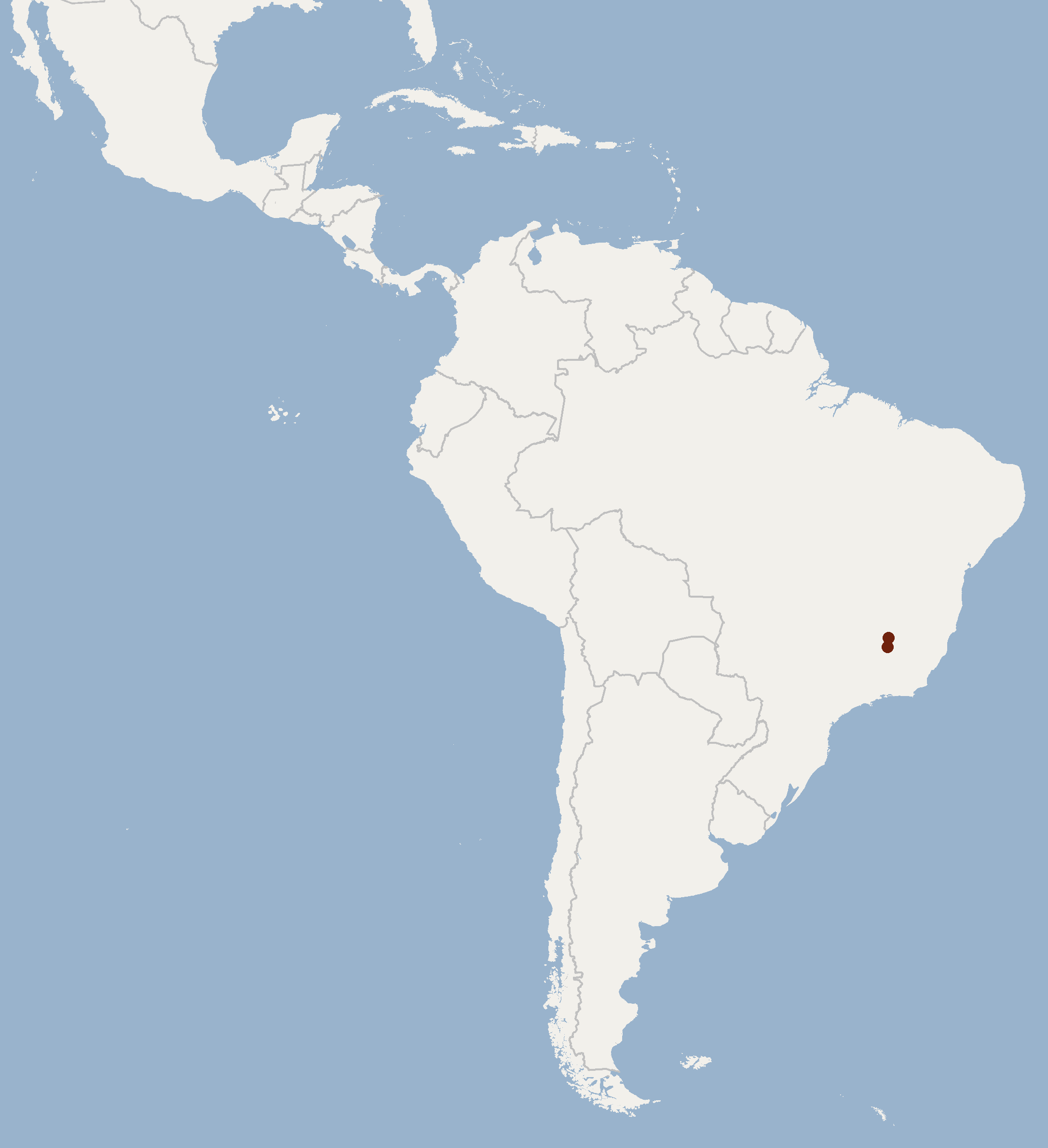

Species of bat

Bokermann's nectar bat (Lonchophylla bokermanni) is a bat species from South America. It is endemic to Brazil. It feeds on nectar, and is listed as an endangered species.

== Etymology ==
This species was discovered by Ivan Sazima and Marlies Sazima in 1974 in Serra do Cipó National Park. The species was described by Ivan Sazima, Luiz Vizotto, and Valdir Taddei in 1978. It was named after Werner Carlos Augusto Bokermann—a prominent Brazilian herpetologist and former head of the bird department at the São Paulo Zoo.

== Taxonomy ==
While it was once thought to have a wider geographic range, a 2013 analysis concluded that the population of L. bokermanni in the Atlantic Forest was actually a new, separate species, Peracchi's nectar bat. The implications of this taxonomic split were part of the reason that this species' listing was changed to endangered in 2016 by the IUCN, as it meant that it was not as widespread as previously thought.

== Description ==
It is a larger member of its genus. The forearm is 38.7–41.3 mm (1.52–1.63 in) long, and their total body length is 60–65 mm (2.4–2.6 in). Their total wingspan is 28 cm (11 in) long, and they weigh approximately 12 g (0.42 oz). Their dental formula is 2.1.2.32.1.3.3. The nose-leaf is approximately 7 mm (0.28 in) long and 5 mm (0.20 in) wide. The ears are short and broad, and are rounded at the tips. Ears are approximately 14 mm (0.55 in) long and 9 mm (0.35 in) wide. The tragus is about 5.5 mm (0.22 in) long and pointed at the tip. The lower lip is furrowed and lined with 4-6 warts. The tongue is long and protrusible, with papillae at the tip. The calcar is short but distinct, at 7.5 mm (0.30 in) long. The plagiopatagium attaches at the ankle. All the flight membranes are hairless and dark in color. Their fur is dense and soft. Fur on the dorsal side is yellowish brown to grayish brown, and darker than fur on the ventral, which is ash gray to grayish brown. The ears and nose-leaf are light brown. It can be distinguished from other members of its genus by its short upper and lower tooth rows, trilobulate lower incisors, distinctly shaped second upper premolars, and narrow premolars and molars.

== Biology ==
This species is nectarivorous, and forages by trap-lining. They hover as they drink from flowers. They are known to feed from Encholirium glaziovii and Bauhinia flowers. Each visit to a flower is brief, lasting only tenths of a second. The bat will circle a chosen flower before facing it to drink. Stomach analysis shows that they also consume pollen and ants. Between foraging bouts, they will take 5-30 minute breaks on short trees. They forage alone. Possibly, they undergo short migrations in response to food availability. They have a karyotype of 28. The x-chromosome is medium-sized and metacentric, while the y-chromosome is small and acrocentric.

== Range and habitat ==
It is only found in the Cerrado of Brazil. What was thought in 2010 to be an expansion of the species' previous range into the Atlantic Forest ended up as the discovery of a new, closely related species Peracchii's nectar bat. Bokermann's nectar bat has only been confirmed in Jaboticatubas, Itambé do Mato Dentro, and Diamantina, all of which are in the Brazilian state of Minas Gerais.

== Conservation ==
In 1996, it was listed as vulnerable by the IUCN. In 2008, it was revised to data deficient, but it has since been uplisted to endangered.
