= Chocoan long-tongued bat =

Conservation status
- Data Deficient (IUCN 3.1)

Scientific classification
- Kingdom: Animalia
- Phylum: Chordata
- Class: Mammalia
- Order: Chiroptera
- Family: Phyllostomidae
- Genus: Lonchophylla
- Species: L. chocoana

Binomial name
- Lonchophylla chocoana Dávalos, 2004
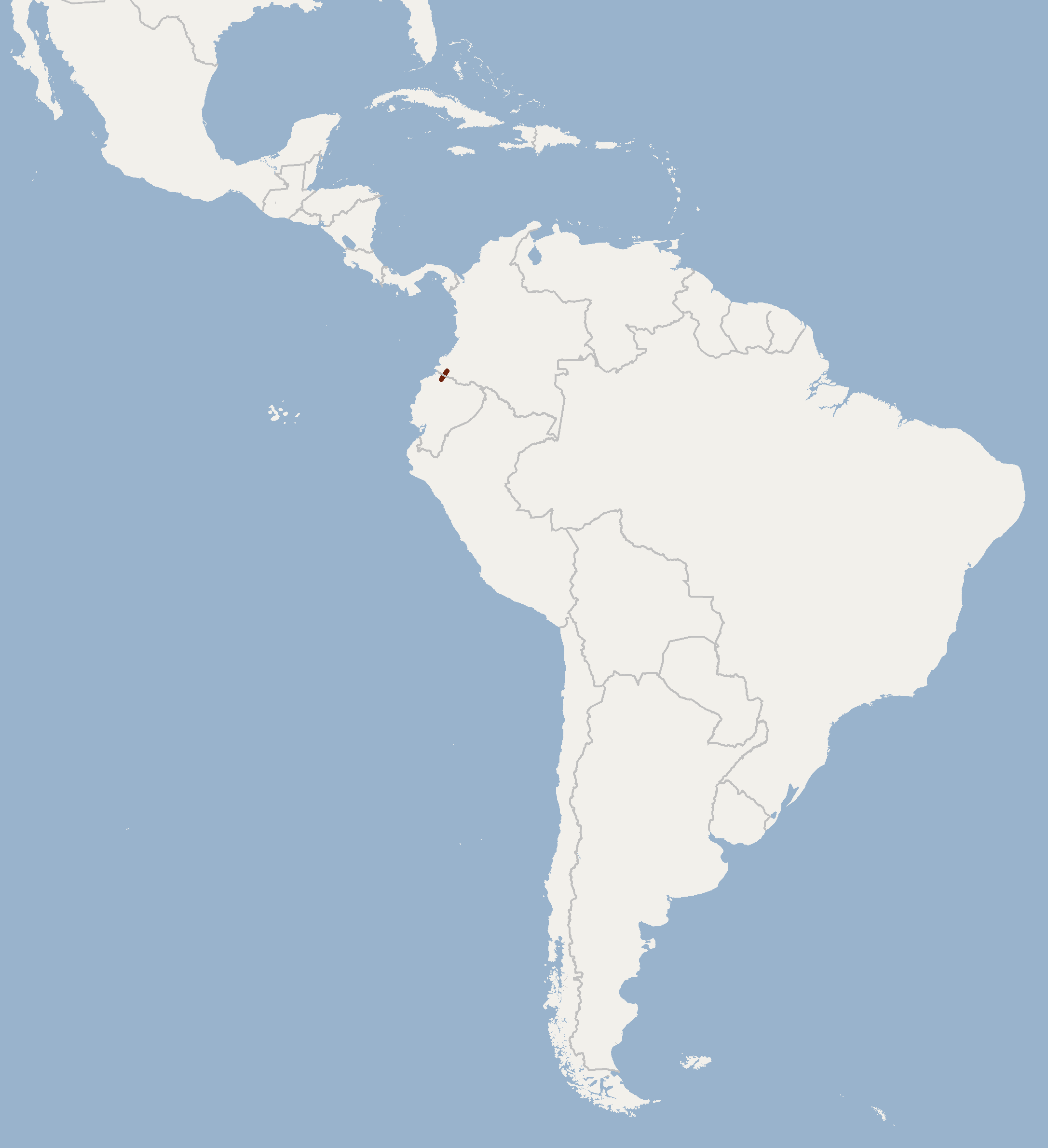

Species of bat

The Chocoan long-tongued bat (Lonchophylla chocoana) is a species of bat found in South America. It was described as a new species in 2004.

== Taxonomy and etymology ==
It was described as a new species in 2004. Its species name "chocoana" is derived from El Chocó—the region where it is found.

== Description ==
It is considered a large member of its genus with a forearm length of 45–48 mm (1.8–1.9 in) and a weight of 19–23 g (0.67–0.81 oz). Its fur is chocolate- or chestnut-brown on its back and brown on its ventral side. It has short ears with rounded tips. Its thumb length is considered an identifying feature, as it is longer than that of similar species at 7.5–8.3 mm (0.30–0.33 in). Its dental formula is the same as all other members of its genus: 2.1.2.32.1.3.3 for a total of 34 teeth.

== Range and habitat ==
Its range includes Ecuador and Colombia in South America. It has only been documented in old-growth rainforest.

== Conservation ==
As of 2016, it is evaluated as data deficient by the IUCN.
