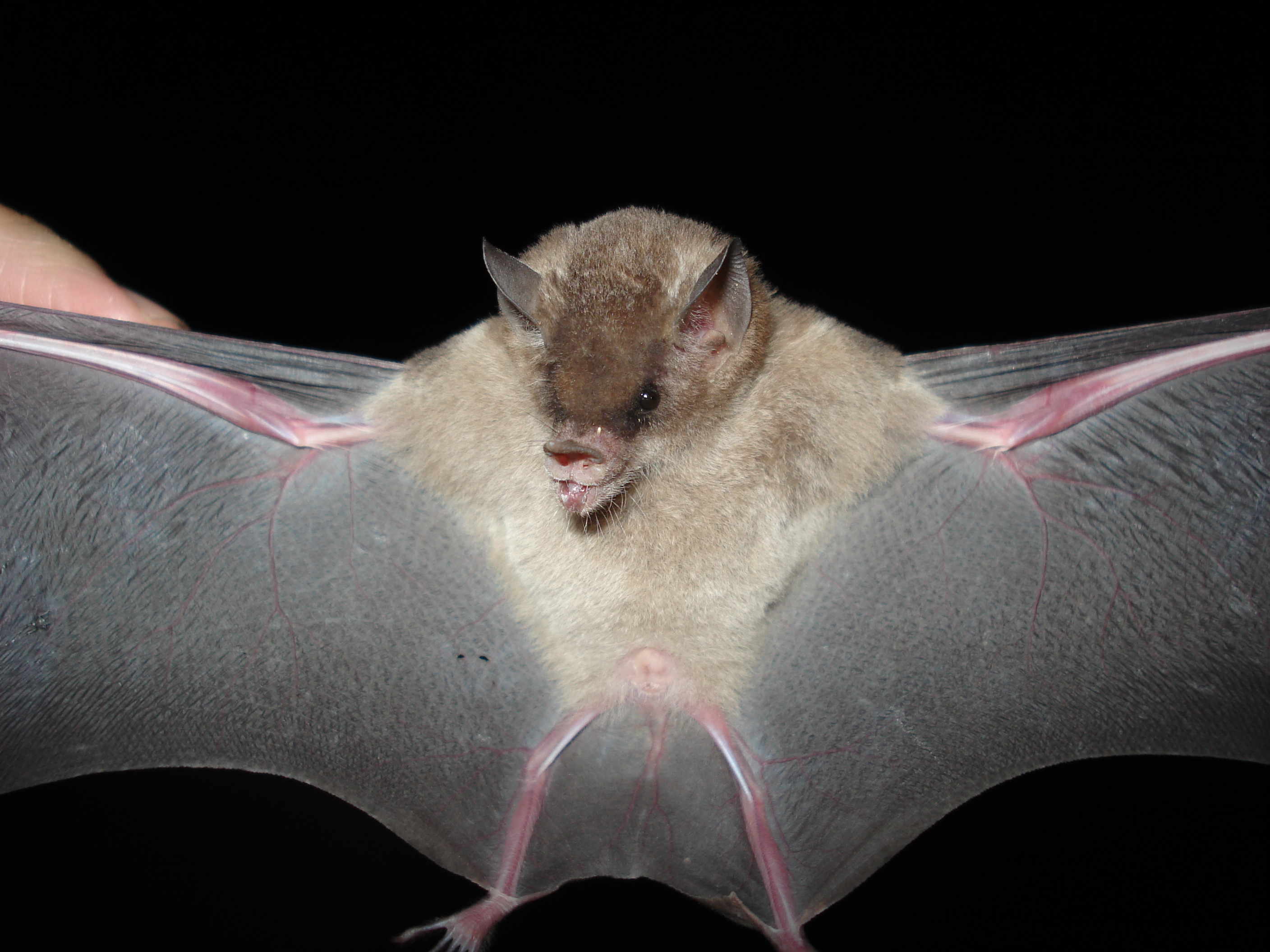

Conservation status
- Endangered (IUCN 3.1)

Scientific classification
- Kingdom: Animalia
- Phylum: Chordata
- Class: Mammalia
- Order: Chiroptera
- Family: Phyllostomidae
- Genus: Lonchophylla
- Species: L. dekeyseri

Binomial name
- Lonchophylla dekeyseri Taddei et al., 1983

= Dekeyser's nectar bat =

Species of bat

Dekeyser's nectar bat (Lonchophylla dekeyseri) is a bat species found in Brazil and Bolivia. It is a member of the leaf-nosed bat family Phyllostomidae.

== Discovery and etymology ==
This species was initially encountered in August 1970 in Brasília National Park. It was described in 1983 by Valdir Taddei, Luiz Vizotto, and Ivan Sazima. The species was named dekeyseri in honor of French zoologist Pierre Louis Dekeyser.

== Description ==
They weigh approximately 10.7 g (0.38 oz). Their forearms are about 35 mm (1.4 in) long. Their dental formula is 2.1.2.32.1.3.3 Their abdomens are paler than their backs. It is considered one of the smaller members of its genus. They have a relatively short skull compared to other Lonchophylla species. Their nose-leaf is small, measuring 6.8 mm (0.27 in) long and 4.6 mm (0.18 in) wide. Their ears are 14 mm (0.55 in) long and 9.5 mm (0.37 in) wide. The tragus tapers to a point, and is about 5 mm (0.20 in) long. The lower lip is grooved, and bordered with small, wart-like protuberances. The calcar is pronounced but short, at 5 mm (0.20 in) long.

== Biology and ecology ==
Their home range is 564–640 ha (2.18–2.47 mi^{2}). Home ranges consist of almost equal parts of the cerrado biome and pasture. It feeds on nectar. Plants in its diet include Hymenaea stigonocarpa, members of the Bauhinia genus (Bauhinia cupulata, B. multinervia, B. brevipes, B. megalandra, B. pauletia, B. ungulata, and B. rufa), and Luehea trees. They also consume nectar from plants of the Lafoensia and Pseudobombax genera. In the dry season, which is when nectar is most abundant, they feed predominantly on nectar. In the wet season, however, they will increase their insect and fruit consumption.

Pups are found July through November. They are thought to be monoestrous, breeding only once per year. Because the roosts contain more females than males, it is possible that they have a harem social structure. They emerge from their roosts shortly after dusk, and return just before dawn in the rainy season. In the dry season, they will return briefly around midnight before leaving again, returning again before dawn. They have 28 chromosomes.

== Habitat and range ==
This bat is endemic to the Cerrado of Brazil. It is dependent on caves for its roosts during the day. It is found in dry forests with calcareous outcroppings.

== Conservation ==
One of the threats to this species is inappropriate efforts to eradicate vampire bats. Vampire bat culling techniques are often applied indiscriminately, and end up killing other species of bat, including endangered species. Methods include lighting dynamite in caves or cementing caves shut during the day while bats are roosting. Current vampire bat management practices have serious and significant negative effects on its population. In 1996, this species was evaluated as vulnerable by the IUCN, which was later revised to near threatened in 2008. In 2016, its status was again revised to endangered. It is listed as endangered because the population likely consists of fewer than 2,500 individuals, its distribution is patchy and limited, and its suitable habitat is rapidly declining. There are six identified subpopulations; each is thought to have fewer than 100 individuals. Because it is associated with karstic landscapes, it is threatened by disturbance from mining.
