= Orcés's long-tongued bat =

Conservation status
- Data Deficient (IUCN 3.1)

Scientific classification
- Kingdom: Animalia
- Phylum: Chordata
- Class: Mammalia
- Order: Chiroptera
- Family: Phyllostomidae
- Genus: Lonchophylla
- Species: L. orcesi

Binomial name
- Lonchophylla orcesi Albuja & Gardner, 2005
- Range of L. orcesi

Species of bat

Orcés's long-tongued bat (Lonchophylla orcesi) is a species of leaf-nosed bat found in Ecuador.

== Taxonomy and etymology ==
It was described as a new species in 2005. The holotype was collected in 1985. The eponym for the species name "orcesi" is Gustavo Orcés, a "pioneer of Ecuadorian research on vertebrates."

== Description ==
It is one of the larger species within Lonchophylla with a forearm length of 47 mm (1.9 in) and a weight of 22 g (0.78 oz). Its back fur is pale brown, while its belly fur is a paler, yellowish-gray brown. Its nose-leaf, ears, tragi, and uropatagium are blackish in color.

== Range and habitat ==
It is endemic to Ecuador. The one known individual was collected within the Cotacachi Cayapas Ecological Reserve, a "very humid pre-montane forest."

As of 2015, it is evaluated as data deficient by the IUCN. The holotype is the only individual to have been documented, as of 2015.
