= Handley's nectar bat =

Conservation status
- Least Concern (IUCN 3.1)

Scientific classification
- Kingdom: Animalia
- Phylum: Chordata
- Class: Mammalia
- Order: Chiroptera
- Family: Phyllostomidae
- Genus: Lonchophylla
- Species: L. handleyi

Binomial name
- Lonchophylla handleyi Hill, 1980

Species of bat

Handley's nectar bat (Lonchophylla handleyi) is a species of bat in the family Phyllostomidae. It is found in Colombia, Ecuador, and Peru.
