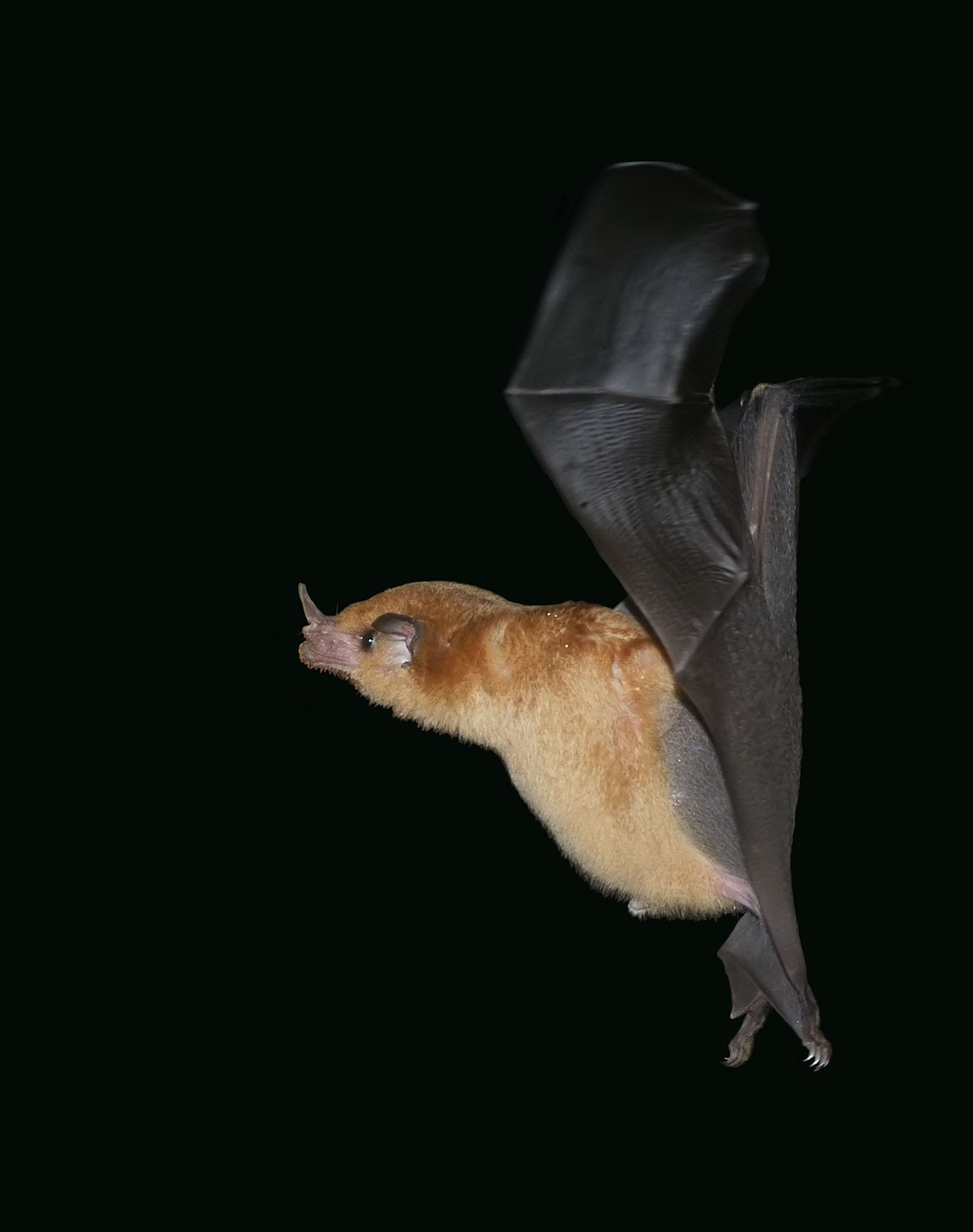

Conservation status
- Least Concern (IUCN 3.1)

Scientific classification
- Kingdom: Animalia
- Phylum: Chordata
- Class: Mammalia
- Order: Chiroptera
- Family: Phyllostomidae
- Genus: Lonchophylla
- Species: L. robusta

Binomial name
- Lonchophylla robusta Miller, 1912
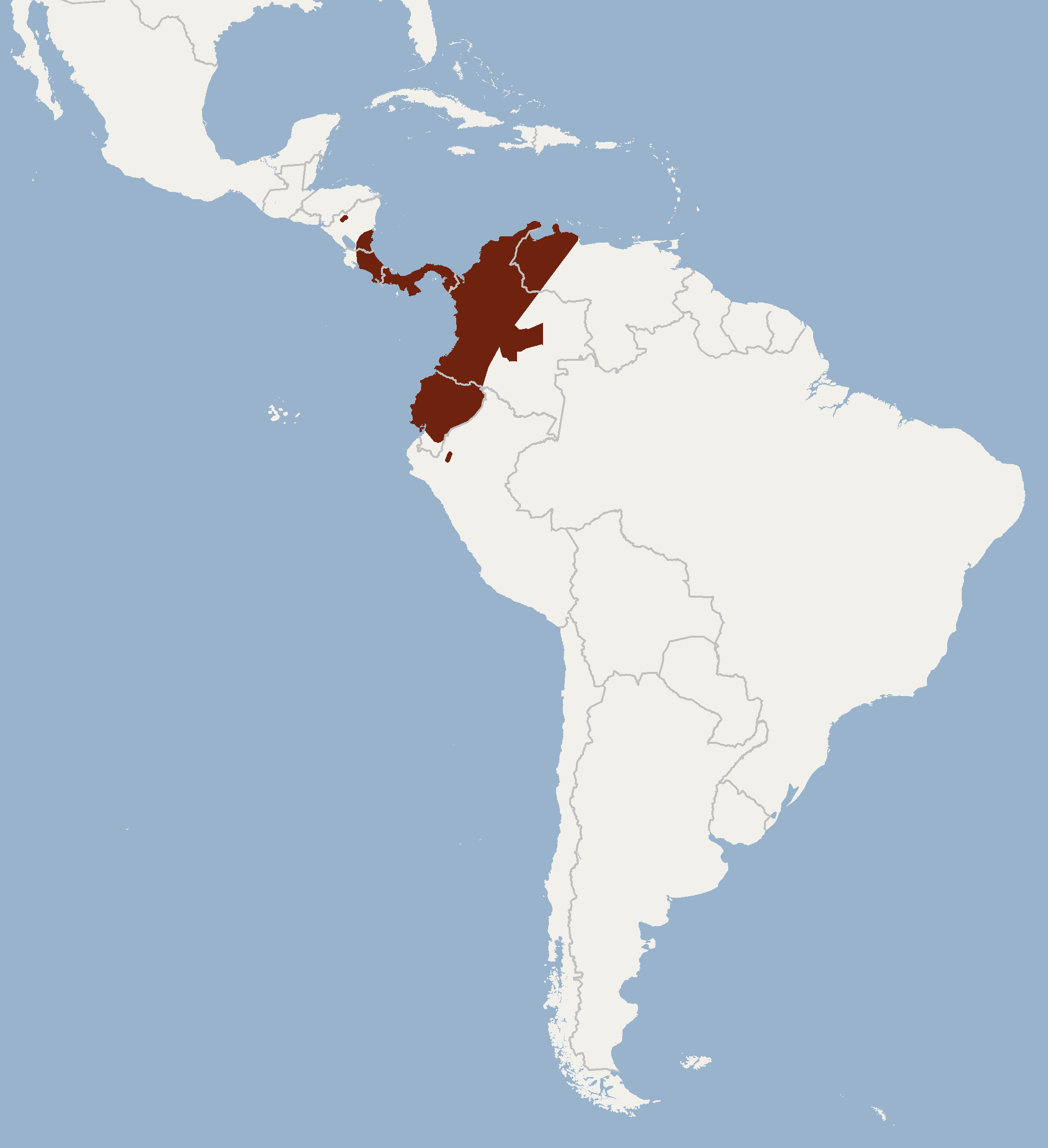

= Orange nectar bat =

Species of bat

The orange nectar bat (Lonchophylla robusta) is a species of bat in the family Phyllostomidae. It is found in Colombia, Costa Rica, Ecuador, Nicaragua, Panama, Peru, and Venezuela.

Orange nectar bats in Costa Rica were observed utilising a unique feeding mechanism that has not been seen in any other animal, allowing them to pull liquid against gravity using a pumping mechanism. The orange nectar bat's tongue contains two grooves filled with tiny muscles that force the nectar up into the bat's mouth. Two forces are at work here, capillary action and muscle force. The orange nectar bat likely developed this method independently of other species due to its unique oral anatomy.
