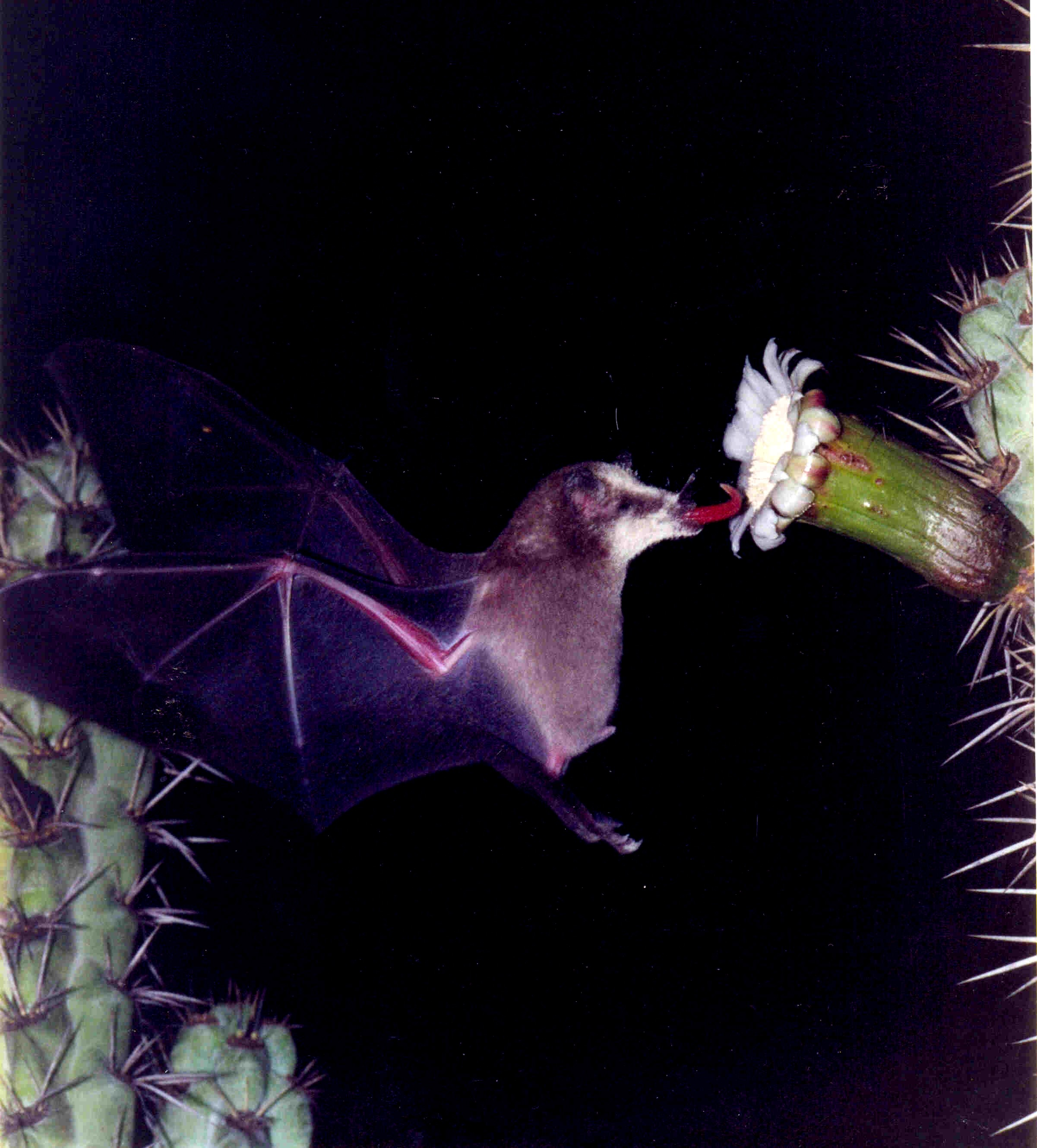
- Visiting Pilosocereus tuberculatus

Conservation status
- Near Threatened (IUCN 3.1)

Scientific classification
- Kingdom: Animalia
- Phylum: Chordata
- Class: Mammalia
- Order: Chiroptera
- Family: Phyllostomidae
- Genus: Lonchophylla
- Species: L. mordax

Binomial name
- Lonchophylla mordax Thomas et al., 1903

= Goldman's nectar bat =

Species of bat

Goldman's nectar bat (Lonchophylla mordax) is a bat species found in Brazil, Colombia, Costa Rica, Ecuador and Panama.
