= List of mammals of Colombia =

This is a list of the mammal species recorded in Colombia. Of the mammals in Colombia, four are critically endangered, eight are endangered, twenty-seven are vulnerable, and six are near threatened. One of the species listed for Colombia is considered to be extinct.

The following tags are used to highlight each species' conservation status as assessed by the International Union for Conservation of Nature:

EX	Extinct	No reasonable doubt that the last individual has died.
EW	Extinct in the wild	Known only to survive in captivity or as a naturalized populations well outside its previous range.
CR	Critically endangered	The species is in imminent risk of extinction in the wild.
EN	Endangered	The species is facing an extremely high risk of extinction in the wild.
VU	Vulnerable	The species is facing a high risk of extinction in the wild.
NT	Near threatened	The species does not meet any of the criteria that would categorise it as risking extinction but it is likely to do so in the future.
LC	Least concern	There are no current identifiable risks to the species.
DD	Data deficient	There is inadequate information to make an assessment of the risks to this species.

Some species were assessed using an earlier set of criteria. Species assessed using this system have the following instead of near threatened and least concern categories:

LR/cd	Lower risk/conservation dependent	Species which were the focus of conservation programmes and may have moved into a higher risk category if that programme was discontinued.
LR/nt	Lower risk/near threatened	Species which are close to being classified as vulnerable but are not the subject of conservation programmes.
LR/lc	Lower risk/least concern	Species for which there are no identifiable risks.

== Subclass: Theria ==
=== Infraclass: Metatheria ===
==== Order: Didelphimorphia (common opossums) ====
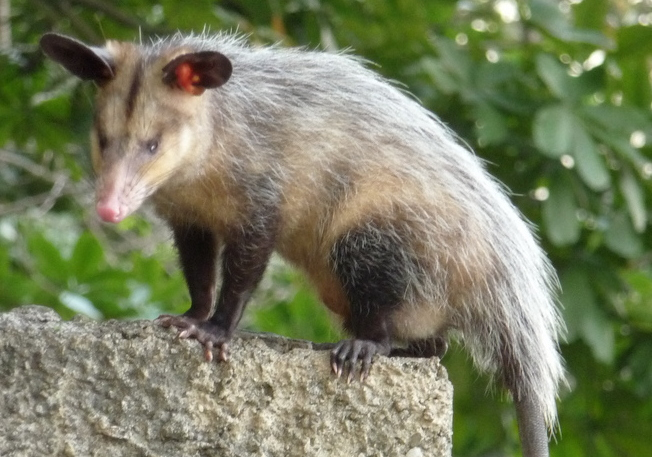
Common opossum

Didelphimorphia is the order of common opossums of the Western Hemisphere. Opossums probably diverged from the basic South American marsupials in the late Cretaceous or early Paleocene. They are small to medium-sized marsupials, about the size of a large house cat, with a long snout and prehensile tail.

- Family: Didelphidae (American opossums)
  - Subfamily: Caluromyinae
    - Genus: Caluromys
      - Derby's woolly opossum, Caluromys derbianus VU
      - Brown-eared woolly opossum, Caluromys lanatus LR/nt
  - Subfamily: Didelphinae
    - Genus: Chironectes
      - Water opossum, Chironectes minimus LR/nt
    - Genus: Didelphis
      - White-eared opossum, Didelphis albiventris LR/lc
      - Common opossum, Didelphis marsupialis LR/lc
    - Genus: Gracilinanus
      - Wood sprite gracile opossum, Gracilinanus dryas VU
      - Long-tailed gracile mouse opossum, Gracilinanus longicaudus DD
      - Northern gracile opossum, Gracilinanus marica LR/nt
      - Columbian gracile mouse opossum, Gracilinanus perijae DD
    - Genus: Lutreolina
      - Big lutrine opossum, Lutreolina crassicaudata LR/lc
    - Genus: Marmosa
      - Alston's mouse opossum, Marmosa alstoni LR/nt
      - White-bellied woolly mouse opossum, Marmosa constantiae LR/nt
      - Woolly mouse opossum, Marmosa demerarae LR/lc
      - Rufous mouse opossum, Marmosa lepida LR/nt
      - Linnaeus's mouse opossum, Marmosa murina LR/lc
      - Bare-tailed woolly mouse opossum, Marmosa regina LR/lc
      - Robinson's mouse opossum, Marmosa robinsoni LR/lc
      - Guajira mouse opossum, Marmosa xerophila EN
    - Genus: Marmosops
      - Dusky slender opossum, Marmosops fuscatus LR/nt
      - Handley's slender opossum, Marmosops handleyi CR
      - Tschudi's slender opossum, Marmosops impavidus LR/nt
      - Delicate slender opossum, Marmosops parvidens LR/nt
    - Genus: Metachirus
      - Brown four-eyed opossum, Metachirus nudicaudatus LR/lc
    - Genus: Monodelphis
      - Sepia short-tailed opossum, Monodelphis adusta LR/lc
    - Genus: Philander
      - Anderson's four-eyed opossum, Philander andersoni LR/lc
      - Gray four-eyed opossum, Philander opossum LR/lc

==== Order: Paucituberculata (shrew opossums) ====
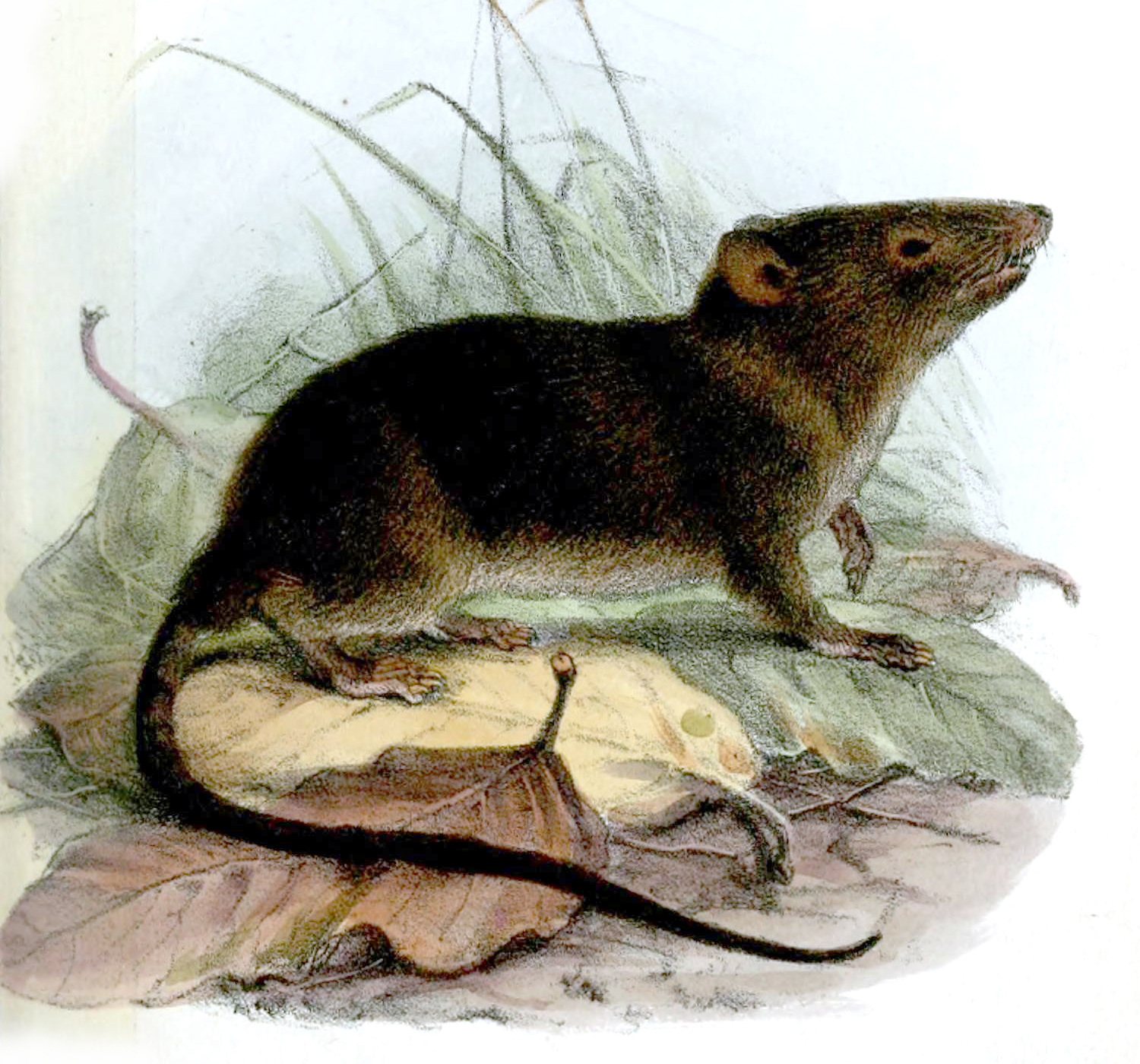
Dusky caenolestid

There are six extant species of shrew opossum. They are small shrew-like marsupials confined to the Andes.

- Family: Caenolestidae
  - Genus: Caenolestes
    - Northern caenolestid, C. convelatus VU
    - Dusky caenolestid, C. fuliginosus LC

=== Infraclass: Eutheria ===
==== Order: Sirenia (manatees and dugongs) ====
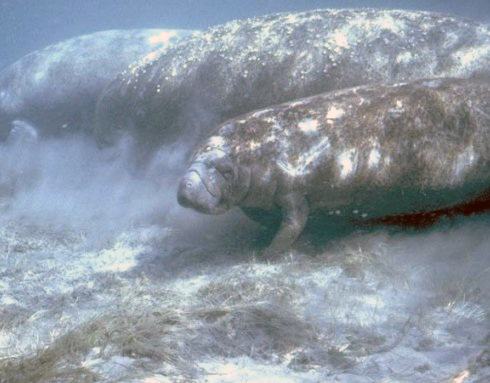
West Indian manatees

Sirenia is an order of fully aquatic, herbivorous mammals that inhabit rivers, estuaries, coastal marine waters, swamps, and marine wetlands. All four species are endangered.

- Family: Trichechidae
  - Genus: Trichechus
    - Amazonian manatee, T. inunguis VU
    - West Indian manatee, T. manatus VU

==== Order: Cingulata (armadillos) ====
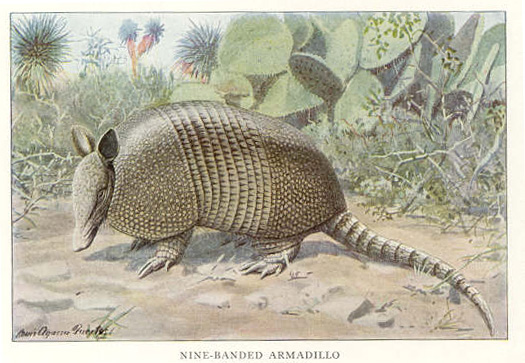
Nine-banded armadillo

The armadillos are small mammals with a bony armored shell. They are native to the Americas. There are around 20 extant species.

- Family: Dasypodidae (armadillos)
  - Subfamily: Dasypodinae
    - Genus: Dasypus
      - Greater long-nosed armadillo, Dasypus kappleri LC
      - Nine-banded armadillo, Dasypus novemcinctus LC
      - Llanos long-nosed armadillo, Dasypus sabanicola LC
  - Subfamily: Tolypeutinae
    - Genus: Cabassous
      - Northern naked-tailed armadillo, Cabassous centralis DD
      - Southern naked-tailed armadillo, Cabassous unicinctus LC
    - Genus: Priodontes
      - Giant armadillo, Priodontes maximus VU

==== Order: Pilosa (anteaters, sloths and tamanduas) ====
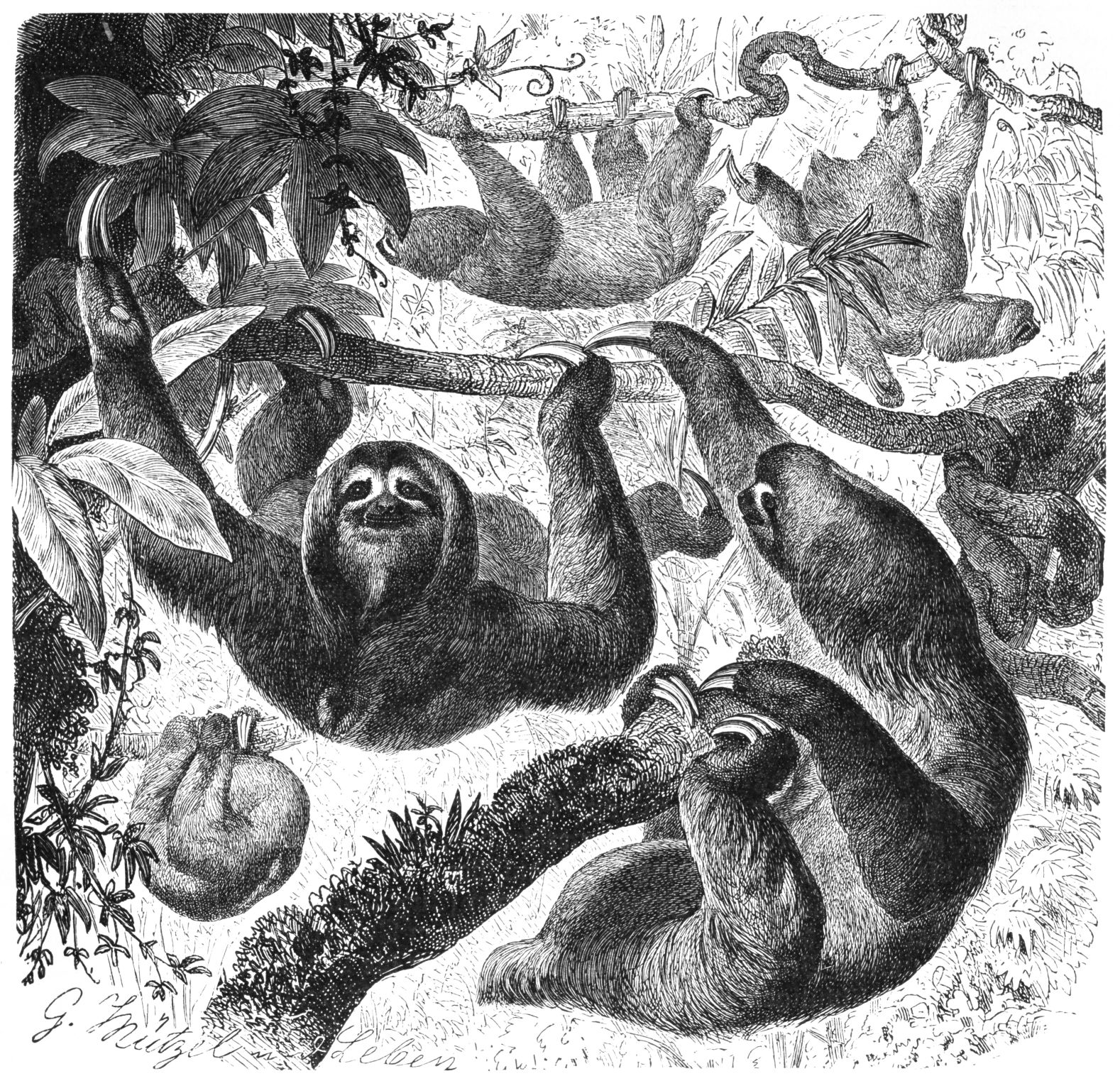
Pale-throated three-toed sloth

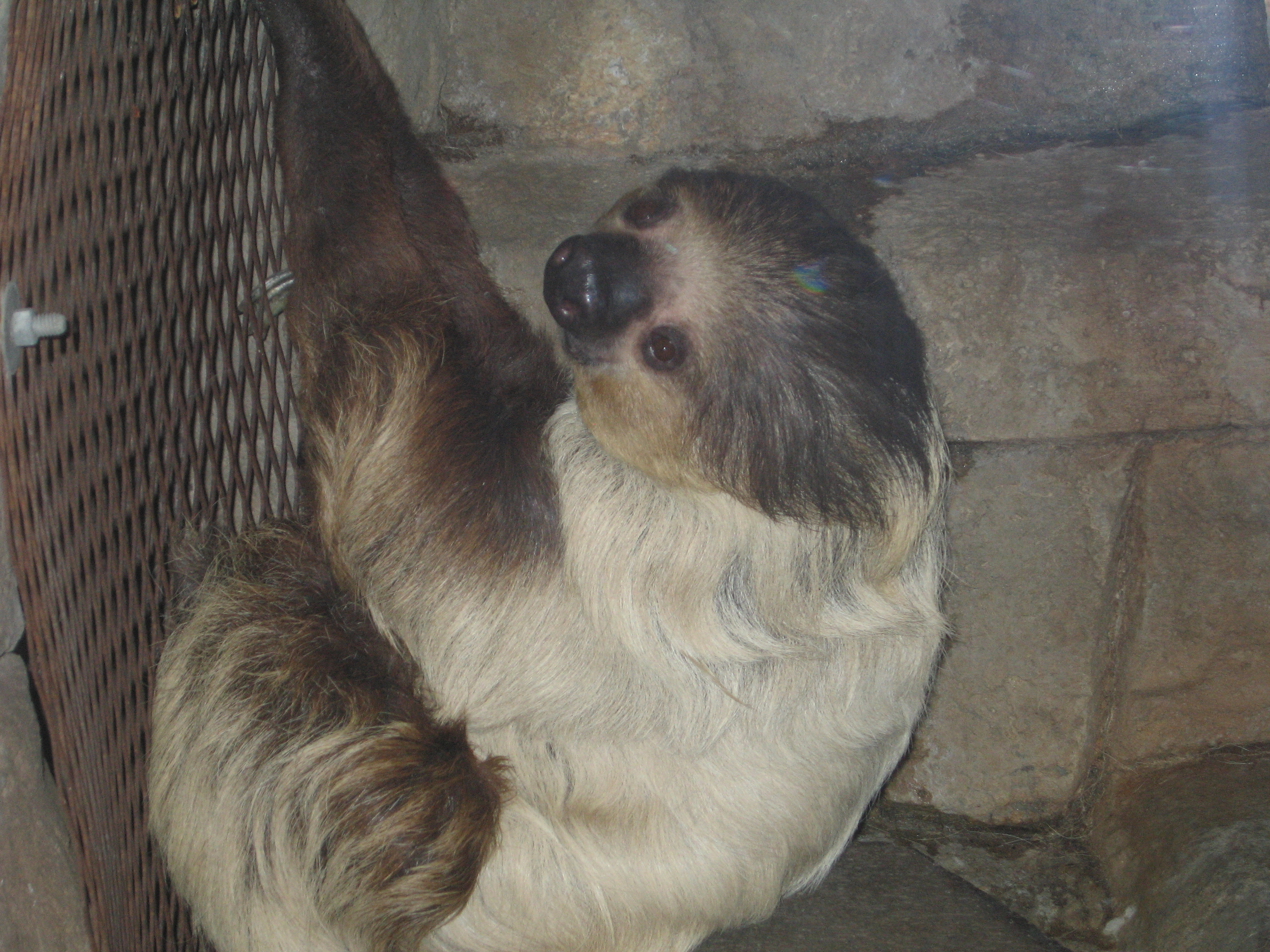
Hoffmann's two-toed sloth

The order Pilosa is extant only in the Americas and includes the anteaters, sloths, and tamanduas.

- Suborder: Folivora
  - Family: Bradypodidae (three-toed sloths)
    - Genus: Bradypus
      - Pale-throated three-toed sloth, Bradypus tridactylus LC
      - Brown-throated three-toed sloth, Bradypus variegatus LC
  - Family: Choloepodidae (two-toed sloths)
    - Genus: Choloepus
      - Linnaeus's two-toed sloth, Choloepus didactylus LC
      - Hoffmann's two-toed sloth, Choloepus hoffmanni LC
- Suborder: Vermilingua
  - Family: Cyclopedidae
    - Genus: Cyclopes
      - Silky anteater, C. didactylus LC
      - Central American silky anteater, C. dorsalis NE
  - Family: Myrmecophagidae (American anteaters)
    - Genus: Myrmecophaga
      - Giant anteater, Myrmecophaga tridactyla NT
    - Genus: Tamandua
      - Northern tamandua, Tamandua mexicana LC
      - Southern tamandua, Tamandua tetradactyla LC

==== Order: Primates ====
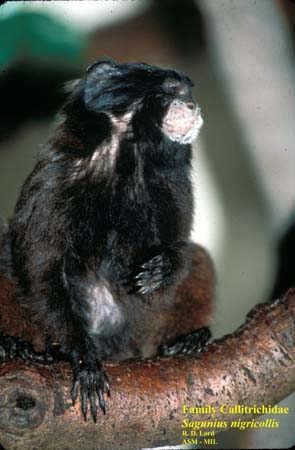
Black-mantled tamarin

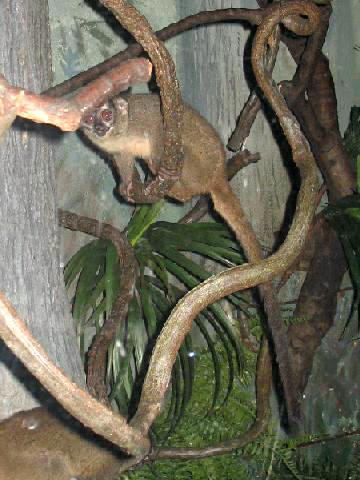
Three-striped night monkey

Bald uakari

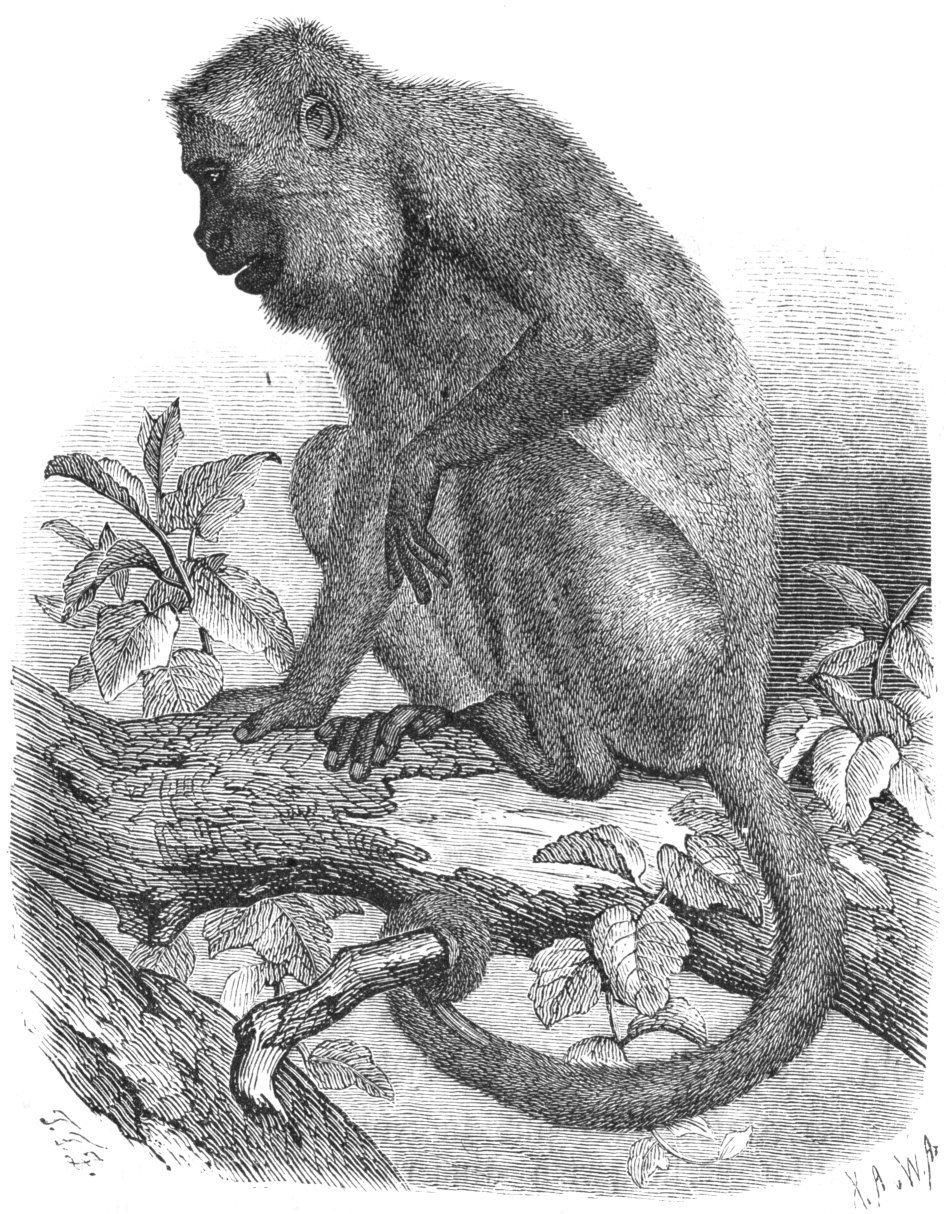
Venezuelan red howler

The order Primates contains humans and their closest relatives: lemurs, lorisoids, monkeys, and apes.

- Suborder: Haplorhini
  - Infraorder: Simiiformes
    - Parvorder: Platyrrhini (New World monkeys)
      - Family: Cebidae
        - Subfamily: Callitrichinae
          - Genus: Cebuella
            - Western pygmy marmoset, Cebuella pygmaea VU
          - Genus: Leontocebus
            - Lesson's saddle-back tamarin, Leontocebus fuscus LC
            - Black-mantled tamarin, Leontocebus nigricollis LC
          - Genus: Saguinus
            - Geoffroy's tamarin, Saguinus geoffroyi LC
            - Mottle-faced tamarin, Saguinus inustus LC
            - White-footed tamarin, Saguinus leucopus VU
            - Cottontop tamarin, Saguinus oedipus EN
          - Genus: Callimico
            - Goeldi's marmoset, Callimico goeldii NT
        - Subfamily: Cebinae
          - Genus: Cebus
            - Humboldt's white-fronted capuchin, Cebus albifrons LC
            - Colombian white-faced capuchin, Cebus capucinus LC
            - Río Cesar white-fronted capuchin, Cebus cesare DD
            - Sierra de Perijá white-fronted capuchin, Cebus leucocephalus
            - Santa Marta white-fronted capuchin, Cebus malitiosus EN
            - Varied white-fronted capuchin, Cebus versicolor EN
            - Marañón white-fronted capuchin, Cebus yuracus
          - Genus Sapajus
            - Large-headed capuchin, Sapajus macrocephalus LC
          - Genus: Saimiri
            - Humboldt's squirrel monkey, Saimiri cassiquiarensis
      - Family: Aotidae
        - Genus: Aotus
          - Gray-bellied night monkey, Aotus lemurinus VU
          - Nancy Ma's night monkey, Aotus nancymaae LC
          - Black-headed night monkey, Aotus nigriceps LC
          - Three-striped night monkey, Aotus trivirgatus LC
          - Spix's night monkey, Aotus vociferans LC
      - Family: Pitheciidae
        - Subfamily: Callicebinae
          - Genus: Callicebus
            - White-tailed titi, Callicebus discolor LC
            - Lucifer titi, Callicebus lucifer LC
            - Black titi, Callicebus lugens LC
            - Colombian black-handed titi, Callicebus medemi LC
            - Ornate titi, Callicebus ornatus VU
        - Subfamily: Pitheciinae
          - Genus: Pithecia
            - Hairy saki, Pithecia hirsuta DD
            - Miller's saki, Pithecia milleri DD
          - Genus: Cacajao
            - Bald uakari, Cacajao calvus VU possibly extirpated
            - Black-headed uakari, Cacajao melanocephalus LC
      - Family: Atelidae
        - Subfamily: Alouattinae
          - Genus: Alouatta
            - Mantled howler, Alouatta palliata LC
            - Venezuelan red howler, Alouatta seniculus LC
        - Subfamily: Atelinae
          - Genus: Ateles
            - White-fronted spider monkey, Ateles belzebuth VU
            - Black-headed spider monkey, Ateles fusciceps CR
            - Geoffroy's spider monkey, Ateles geoffroyi LC
            - Brown spider monkey, Ateles hybridus CR
          - Genus: Lagothrix
            - Brown woolly monkey, Lagothrix lagothricha LR/lc
            - Colombian woolly monkey, Lagothrix lugens VU

==== Order: Rodentia (rodents) ====
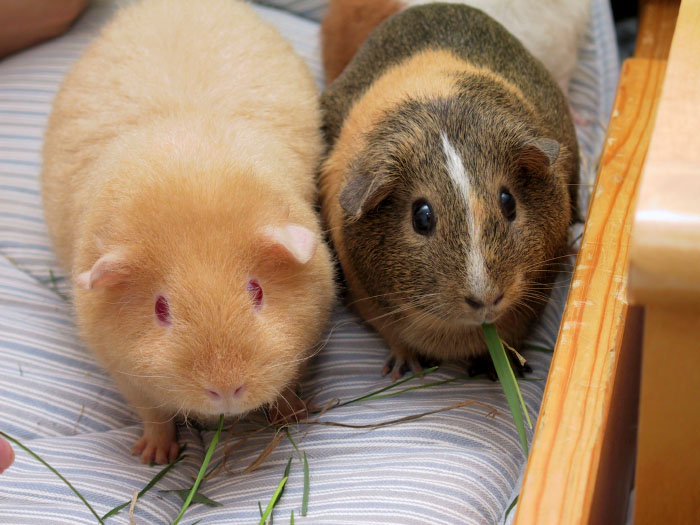
Guinea pig

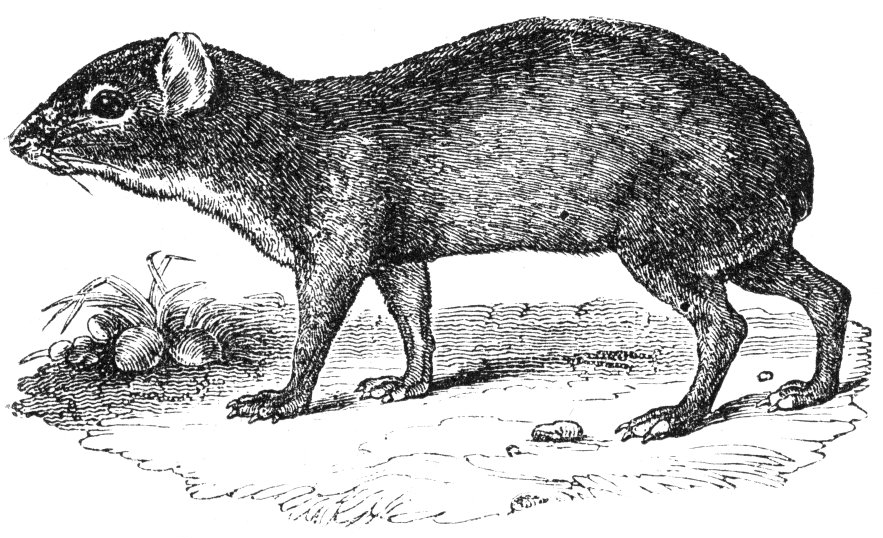
Black agouti

Rodents make up the largest order of mammals, with over 40% of mammalian species. They have two incisors in the upper and lower jaw which grow continually and must be kept short by gnawing. Most rodents are small though the capybara can weigh up to 45 kg (99 lb).

- Suborder: Hystricognathi
  - Family: Erethizontidae (New World porcupines)
    - Subfamily: Erethizontinae
      - Genus: Coendou
        - Bicolor-spined porcupine, Coendou bicolor LR/lc
        - Brazilian porcupine, Coendou prehensilis LR/lc
        - Stump-tailed porcupine, Coendou rufescens LR/lc
        - Brown hairy dwarf porcupine, Coendou vestitus VU
  - Family: Dinomyidae (pacarana)
    - Genus: Dinomys
      - Pacarana, Dinomys branickii EN
  - Family: Caviidae (guinea pigs)
    - Subfamily: Caviinae
      - Genus: Cavia
        - Brazilian guinea pig, Cavia aperea LR/lc
    - Subfamily: Hydrochoerinae (capybaras and rock cavies)
      - Genus: Hydrochoerus
        - Capybara, Hydrochoerus hydrochaeris LR/lc
        - Lesser capybara, Hydrochoerus isthmius LR/lc
  - Family: Dasyproctidae (agoutis and pacas)
    - Genus: Dasyprocta
      - Black agouti, Dasyprocta fuliginosa LR/lc
      - Central American agouti, Dasyprocta punctata LR/lc
      - Red-rumped agouti, Dasyprocta leporina LR/lc
    - Genus: Myoprocta
      - Red acouchi, Myoprocta acouchy LR/lc
  - Family: Cuniculidae
    - Genus: Cuniculus
      - Lowland paca, Cuniculus paca LC
      - Mountain paca, Cuniculus taczanowskii LR/nt
  - Family: Echimyidae
    - Subfamily: Dactylomyinae
      - Genus: Dactylomys
        - Amazon bamboo rat, Dactylomys dactylinus LR/lc
      - Genus: Olallamys
        - White-tailed olalla rat, Olallamys albicauda LR/nt
        - Greedy olalla rat, Olallamys edax LR/nt
    - Subfamily: Echimyinae
      - Genus: Diplomys
        - Colombian soft-furred spiny rat, Diplomys caniceps LR/nt
        - Rufous soft-furred spiny-rat, Diplomys labilis LR/lc
      - Genus: Santamartamys
        - Red-crested tree-rat, Santamartamys rufodorsalis CR
      - Genus: Echimys
        - Speckled spiny tree-rat, Echimys semivillosus LR/lc
      - Genus: Isothrix
        - Yellow-crowned brush-tailed rat, Isothrix bistriata LR/nt
    - Subfamily: Eumysopinae
      - Genus: Hoplomys
        - Armored rat, Hoplomys gymnurus LR/lc
      - Genus: Mesomys
        - Ferreira's spiny tree-rat, Mesomys hispidus LR/lc
      - Genus: Proechimys
        - Short-tailed spiny rat, Proechimys brevicauda LR/lc
        - Colombian spiny rat, Proechimys canicollis LR/lc
        - Guyenne spiny rat, Proechimys guyannensis LR/lc
        - Boyaca spiny rat, Proechimys chrysaeolus LR/lc
        - Magdalena spiny rat, Proechimys magdalenae LR/lc
        - Minca spiny rat, Proechimys mincae LR/lc
        - O'Connell's spiny rat, Proechimys oconnelli LR/lc
        - Gray-footed spiny rat, Proechimys poliopus LR/lc
        - Napo spiny rat, Proechimys quadruplicatus LR/lc
        - Tome's spiny rat, Proechimys semispinosus LR/lc
        - Simon's spiny rat, Proechimys simonsi LR/lc
- Suborder: Sciurognathi
  - Family: Sciuridae (squirrels)
    - Subfamily: Sciurinae
      - Tribe: Sciurini
        - Genus: Sciurillus
          - Neotropical pygmy squirrel, Sciurillus pusillus LR/lc
        - Genus: Microsciurus
          - Central American dwarf squirrel, Microsciurus alfari LR/lc
          - Amazon dwarf squirrel, Microsciurus flaviventer LR/lc
          - Western dwarf squirrel, Microsciurus mimulus LR/lc
          - Santander dwarf squirrel, Microsciurus santanderensis LR/lc
        - Genus: Sciurus
          - Red-tailed squirrel, Sciurus granatensis LR/lc
          - Northern Amazon red squirrel, Sciurus igniventris LR/lc
          - Andean squirrel, Sciurus pucheranii LR/lc
          - Southern Amazon red squirrel, Sciurus spadiceus LR/lc
  - Family: Geomyidae
    - Genus: Orthogeomys
      - Thaeler's pocket gopher, Orthogeomys thaeleri LR/lc
  - Family: Heteromyidae
    - Subfamily: Heteromyinae
      - Genus: Heteromys
        - Trinidad spiny pocket mouse, Heteromys anomalus LR/lc
        - Southern spiny pocket mouse, Heteromys australis LR/lc
        - Desmarest's spiny pocket mouse, Heteromys desmarestianus LR/lc
  - Family: Cricetidae
    - Subfamily: Tylomyinae
      - Genus: Tylomys
        - Mira climbing rat, Tylomys mirae LR/lc
    - Subfamily: Neotominae
      - Genus: Reithrodontomys
        - Mexican harvest mouse, Reithrodontomys mexicanus LR/lc
    - Subfamily: Sigmodontinae
      - Genus: Aepeomys
        - Dusky montane mouse, Aepeomys fuscatus LR/lc
      - Genus: Akodon
        - Colombian grass mouse, Akodon affinis LR/lc
        - Bogotá grass mouse, Akodon bogotensis LR/lc
        - Northern grass mouse, Akodon urichi LR/lc
      - Genus: Calomys
        - Hummelinck's vesper mouse, Calomys hummelincki LR/lc
      - Genus: Chibchanomys
        - Chibchan water mouse, Chibchanomys trichotis LR/nt
      - Genus: Chilomys
        - Colombian forest mouse, Chilomys instans LR/lc
      - Genus: Holochilus
        - Amazonian marsh rat, Holochilus sciureus LR/lc
      - Genus: Ichthyomys
        - Crab-eating rat, Ichthyomys hydrobates LR/nt
      - Genus: Melanomys
        - Dusky rice rat, Melanomys caliginosus LR/lc
      - Genus: Microryzomys
        - Highland small rice rat, Microryzomys altissimus LR/lc
        - Forest small rice rat, Microryzomys minutus LR/lc
      - Genus: Neacomys
        - Common bristly mouse, Neacomys spinosus LR/lc
        - Narrow-footed bristly mouse, Neacomys tenuipes LR/lc
      - Genus: Nectomys
        - Scaly-footed water rat, Nectomys squamipes LR/lc
      - Genus: Neusticomys
        - Montane fish-eating rat, Neusticomys monticolus LR/lc
      - Genus: Oecomys
        - Bicolored arboreal rice rat, Oecomys bicolor LR/lc
        - Unicolored arboreal rice rat, Oecomys concolor LR/lc
        - Yellow arboreal rice rat, Oecomys flavicans LR/lc
        - Savanna arboreal rice rat, Oecomys speciosus LR/lc
        - Trinidad arboreal rice rat, Oecomys trinitatis LR/lc
      - Genus: Oligoryzomys
        - Destructive pygmy rice rat, Oligoryzomys destructor DD
        - Fulvous pygmy rice rat, Oligoryzomys fulvescens LR/lc
        - Grayish pygmy rice rat, Oligoryzomys griseolus LR/lc
      - Genus: Oryzomys
        - Tomes's rice rat, Oryzomys albigularis LR/lc
        - Alfaro's rice rat, Oryzomys alfaroi LR/lc
        - Bolivar rice rat, Oryzomys bolivaris LR/lc
        - Coues' rice rat, Oryzomys couesi LR/lc
        - Gorgas's rice rat, Oryzomys gorgasi CR
        - Colombian rice rat, Oryzomys intectus LR/lc
        - MacConnell's rice rat, Oryzomys macconnelli LR/lc
        - Azara's broad-headed rice rat, Oryzomys megacephalus LR/lc
        - Talamancan rice rat, Oryzomys talamancae LR/lc
      - Genus: Rhipidomys
        - Cauca climbing mouse, Rhipidomys caucensis LR/nt
        - Coues's climbing mouse, Rhipidomys couesi LR/lc
        - Buff-bellied climbing mouse, Rhipidomys fulviventer LR/lc
        - Broad-footed climbing mouse, Rhipidomys latimanus LR/lc
        - Atlantic Forest climbing mouse, Rhipidomys mastacalis LR/lc
        - Venezuelan climbing mouse, Rhipidomys venezuelae LR/lc
      - Genus: Sigmodon
        - Alston's cotton rat, Sigmodon alstoni LR/lc
        - Southern cotton rat, Sigmodon hirsutus LC
      - Genus: Sigmodontomys
        - Alfaro's rice water rat, Sigmodontomys alfari LR/lc
      - Genus: Thomasomys
        - Golden Oldfield mouse, Thomasomys aureus LR/lc
        - Silky Oldfield mouse, Thomasomys bombycinus LR/lc
        - Ashy-bellied Oldfield mouse, Thomasomys cinereiventer LR/lc
        - Woodland Oldfield mouse, Thomasomys hylophilus LR/lc
        - Soft-furred Oldfield mouse, Thomasomys laniger LR/lc
        - Unicolored Oldfield mouse, Thomasomys monochromos LR/nt
        - Snow-footed Oldfield mouse, Thomasomys niveipes LR/lc
      - Genus: Zygodontomys
        - Short-tailed cane rat, Zygodontomys brevicauda LR/lc
        - Brown cane mouse, Zygodontomys brunneus LR/lc

==== Order: Lagomorpha (lagomorphs) ====
The lagomorphs comprise two families, Leporidae (hares and rabbits), and Ochotonidae (pikas). Though they can resemble rodents, and were classified as a superfamily in that order until the early 20th century, they have since been considered a separate order. They differ from rodents in a number of physical characteristics, such as having four incisors in the upper jaw rather than two.

- Family: Leporidae (rabbits, hares)
  - Genus: Sylvilagus
    - Andean tapetí, Sylvilagus andinus DD
    - Bogota tapetí, Sylvilagus apollinaris NE
    - Common tapetí, Sylvilagus brasiliensis EN
    - Eastern cottontail, Sylvilagus floridanus LR/lc
    - Fulvous tapetí, Sylvilagus fulvescens NE
    - Nicefor's tapetí, Sylvilagus nicefori NE
    - Colombian tapetí, Sylvilagus salentus NE
    - Santa Marta tapetí, Sylvilagus sanctaemartae DD

==== Order: Eulipotyphla (shrews, hedgehogs, moles, and solenodons) ====
Eulipotyphlans are insectivorous mammals. Shrews and solenodons closely resemble mice, hedgehogs carry spines, while moles are stout-bodied burrowers.

- Family: Soricidae (shrews)
  - Subfamily: Soricinae
    - Tribe: Blarinini
      - Genus: Cryptotis
        - Scaly-footed small-eared shrew, Cryptotis squamipes LR/lc
        - Thomas' small-eared shrew, Cryptotis thomasi LR/lc

==== Order: Chiroptera (bats) ====
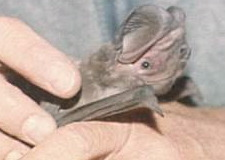
Western mastiff bat

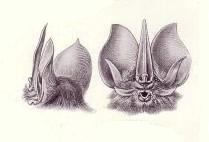
Tomes's sword-nosed bat

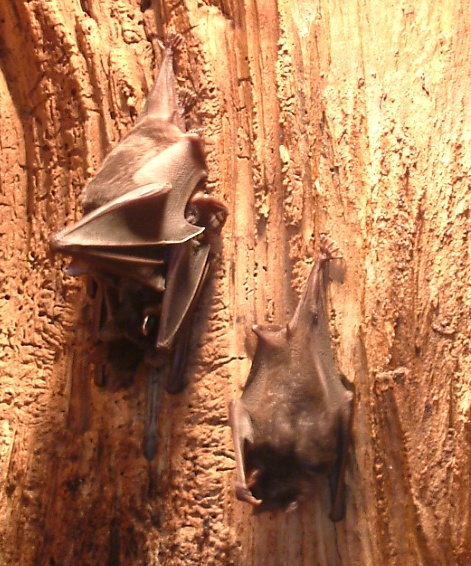
Pale spear-nosed bat

The bats' most distinguishing feature is that their forelimbs are developed as wings, making them the only mammals capable of flight. Bat species account for about 20% of all mammals.

- Family: Noctilionidae
  - Genus: Noctilio
    - Lesser bulldog bat, Noctilio albiventris LR/lc
    - Greater bulldog bat, Noctilio leporinus LR/lc
- Family: Vespertilionidae
  - Subfamily: Myotinae
    - Genus: Myotis
      - Silver-tipped myotis, Myotis albescens LR/lc
      - Hairy-legged myotis, Myotis keaysi LR/lc
      - Curacao myotis, Myotis nesopolus LR/nt
      - Black myotis, Myotis nigricans LR/lc
      - Montane myotis, Myotis oxyotus LR/lc
      - Riparian myotis, Myotis riparius LR/lc
      - Velvety myotis, Myotis simus LR/lc
  - Subfamily: Vespertilioninae
    - Genus: Eptesicus
      - Little black serotine, Eptesicus andinus LR/lc
      - Brazilian brown bat, Eptesicus brasiliensis LR/lc
      - Argentine brown bat, Eptesicus furinalis LR/lc
      - Big brown bat, Eptesicus fuscus LR/lc
    - Genus: Histiotus
      - Small big-eared brown bat, Histiotus montanus LR/lc
    - Genus: Lasiurus
      - Desert red bat, Lasiurus blossevillii LR/lc
      - Tacarcuna bat, Lasiurus castaneus VU
      - Hoary bat, Lasiurus cinereus LR/lc
      - Southern yellow bat, Lasiurus ega LR/lc
      - Big red bat, Lasiurus egregius LR/nt
    - Genus: Rhogeessa
      - Tiny yellow bat, Rhogeessa minutilla LR/nt
- Family: Molossidae
  - Genus: Cynomops
    - Cinnamon dog-faced bat, Cynomops abrasus LR/nt
    - Greenhall's dog-faced bat, Cynomops greenhalli LR/lc
    - Southern dog-faced bat, Cynomops planirostris LR/lc
  - Genus: Eumops
    - Black bonneted bat, Eumops auripendulus LR/lc
    - Dwarf bonneted bat, Eumops bonariensis LR/lc
    - Big bonneted bat, Eumops dabbenei LR/lc
    - Wagner's bonneted bat, Eumops glaucinus LR/lc
    - Sanborn's bonneted bat, Eumops hansae LR/lc
    - Western mastiff bat, Eumops perotis LR/lc
  - Genus: Molossops
    - Mato Grosso dog-faced bat, Molossops mattogrossensis LR/nt
    - Dwarf dog-faced bat, Molossops temminckii LR/lc
  - Genus: Molossus
    - Black mastiff bat, Molossus ater LR/lc
    - Bonda mastiff bat, Molossus bondae LR/lc
    - Velvety free-tailed bat, Molossus molossus LR/lc
    - Miller's mastiff bat, Molossus pretiosus LR/lc
    - Sinaloan mastiff bat, Molossus sinaloae LR/lc
  - Genus: Nyctinomops
    - Peale's free-tailed bat, Nyctinomops aurispinosus LR/lc
    - Broad-eared bat, Nyctinomops laticaudatus LR/lc
    - Big free-tailed bat, Nyctinomops macrotis LR/lc
  - Genus: Promops
    - Big crested mastiff bat, Promops centralis LR/lc
  - Genus: Tadarida
    - Mexican free-tailed bat, Tadarida brasiliensis LR/nt
- Family: Emballonuridae
  - Genus: Balantiopteryx
    - Ecuadorian sac-winged bat, Balantiopteryx infusca EN
  - Genus: Centronycteris
    - Shaggy bat, Centronycteris maximiliani LR/lc
  - Genus: Cormura
    - Wagner's sac-winged bat, Cormura brevirostris LR/lc
  - Genus: Cyttarops
    - Short-eared bat, Cyttarops alecto LR/nt
  - Genus: Diclidurus
    - Northern ghost bat, Diclidurus albus LR/lc
    - Greater ghost bat, Diclidurus ingens VU
    - Isabelle's ghost bat, Diclidurus isabella LR/nt
  - Genus: Peropteryx
    - Greater dog-like bat, Peropteryx kappleri LR/lc
    - White-winged dog-like bat, Peropteryx leucoptera LR/lc
    - Lesser doglike bat, Peropteryx macrotis LR/lc
  - Genus: Rhynchonycteris
    - Proboscis bat, Rhynchonycteris naso LR/lc
  - Genus: Saccopteryx
    - Greater sac-winged bat, Saccopteryx bilineata LR/lc
    - Frosted sac-winged bat, Saccopteryx canescens LR/lc
    - Lesser sac-winged bat, Saccopteryx leptura LR/lc
- Family: Mormoopidae
  - Genus: Mormoops
    - Ghost-faced bat, Mormoops megalophylla LR/lc
  - Genus: Pteronotus
    - Naked-backed bat, Pteronotus davyi LR/lc
    - Big naked-backed bat, Pteronotus gymnonotus LR/lc
    - Parnell's mustached bat, Pteronotus parnellii LR/lc
    - Wagner's mustached bat, Pteronotus personatus LR/lc
- Family: Phyllostomidae
  - Subfamily: Phyllostominae
    - Genus: Chrotopterus
      - Big-eared woolly bat, Chrotopterus auritus LR/lc
    - Genus: Glyphonycteris
      - Davies's big-eared bat, Glyphonycteris daviesi LR/nt
      - Tricolored big-eared bat, Glyphonycteris sylvestris LR/nt
    - Genus: Lampronycteris
      - Yellow-throated big-eared bat, Lampronycteris brachyotis LR/lc
    - Genus: Lonchorhina
      - Tomes's sword-nosed bat, Lonchorhina aurita LR/lc
      - Marinkelle's sword-nosed bat, Lonchorhina marinkellei VU
      - Orinoco sword-nosed bat, Lonchorhina orinocensis LR/nt
    - Genus: Lophostoma
      - Pygmy round-eared bat, Lophostoma brasiliense LR/lc
      - Carriker's round-eared bat, Lophostoma carrikeri VU
      - White-throated round-eared bat, Lophostoma silvicolum LR/lc
    - Genus: Macrophyllum
      - Long-legged bat, Macrophyllum macrophyllum LR/lc
    - Genus: Micronycteris
      - Hairy big-eared bat, Micronycteris hirsuta LR/lc
      - Little big-eared bat, Micronycteris megalotis LR/lc
      - White-bellied big-eared bat, Micronycteris minuta LR/lc
      - Schmidts's big-eared bat, Micronycteris schmidtorum LR/lc
    - Genus: Mimon
      - Striped hairy-nosed bat, Mimon crenulatum LR/lc
    - Genus: Neonycteris
      - Least big-eared bat, Neonycteris pusilla VU
    - Genus: Phylloderma
      - Pale-faced bat, Phylloderma stenops LR/lc
    - Genus: Phyllostomus
      - Pale spear-nosed bat, Phyllostomus discolor LR/lc
      - Lesser spear-nosed bat, Phyllostomus elongatus LR/lc
      - Greater spear-nosed bat, Phyllostomus hastatus LR/lc
      - Guianan spear-nosed bat, Phyllostomus latifolius LR/nt
    - Genus: Tonatia
      - Stripe-headed round-eared bat, Tonatia saurophila LR/lc
    - Genus: Trachops
      - Fringe-lipped bat, Trachops cirrhosus LR/lc
    - Genus: Trinycteris
      - Niceforo's big-eared bat, Trinycteris nicefori LR/lc
    - Genus: Vampyrum
      - Spectral bat, Vampyrum spectrum LR/nt
  - Subfamily: Lonchophyllinae
    - Genus: Lionycteris
      - Chestnut long-tongued bat, Lionycteris spurrelli LR/lc
    - Genus: Lonchophylla
      - Handley's nectar bat, Lonchophylla handleyi VU
      - Godman's nectar bat, Lonchophylla mordax LR/lc
      - Orange nectar bat, Lonchophylla robusta LR/lc
      - Thomas's nectar bat, Lonchophylla thomasi LR/lc
  - Subfamily: Glossophaginae
    - Genus: Anoura
      - Tailed tailless bat, Anoura caudifer LR/lc
      - Handley's tailless bat, Anoura cultrata LR/lc
      - Geoffroy's tailless bat, Anoura geoffroyi LR/lc
      - Broad-toothed tailless bat, Anoura latidens LR/nt
    - Genus: Choeroniscus
      - Godman's long-tailed bat, Choeroniscus godmani LR/nt
      - Intermediate long-tailed bat, Choeroniscus intermedius LR/nt
      - Minor long-nosed long-tongued bat, Choeroniscus minor LR/lc
      - Greater long-tailed bat, Choeroniscus periosus VU
    - Genus: Glossophaga
      - Commissaris's long-tongued bat, Glossophaga commissarisi LR/lc
      - Miller's long-tongued bat, Glossophaga longirostris LR/lc
      - Pallas's long-tongued bat, Glossophaga soricina LR/lc
    - Genus: Leptonycteris
      - Southern long-nosed bat, Leptonycteris curasoae VU
    - Genus: Lichonycteris
      - Dark long-tongued bat, Lichonycteris obscura LR/lc
    - Genus: Scleronycteris
      - Ega long-tongued bat, Scleronycteris ega VU
  - Subfamily: Carolliinae
    - Genus: Carollia
      - Silky short-tailed bat, Carollia brevicauda LR/lc
      - Chestnut short-tailed bat, Carollia castanea LR/lc
      - Seba's short-tailed bat, Carollia perspicillata LR/lc
    - Genus: Rhinophylla
      - Hairy little fruit bat, Rhinophylla alethina LR/nt
      - Fischer's little fruit bat, Rhinophylla fischerae LR/nt
  - Subfamily: Stenodermatinae
    - Genus: Artibeus
      - Large fruit-eating bat, Artibeus amplus LR/nt
      - Andersen's fruit-eating bat, Artibeus anderseni LR/lc
      - Brown fruit-eating bat, Artibeus concolor LR/nt
      - Silver fruit-eating bat, Artibeus glaucus LR/lc
      - Jamaican fruit bat, Artibeus jamaicensis LR/lc
      - Great fruit-eating bat, Artibeus lituratus LR/lc
      - Dark fruit-eating bat, Artibeus obscurus LR/nt
      - Pygmy fruit-eating bat, Artibeus phaeotis LR/lc
      - Flat-faced fruit-eating bat, Artibeus planirostris LR/lc
      - Toltec fruit-eating bat, Artibeus toltecus LR/lc
    - Genus: Centurio
      - Wrinkle-faced bat, Centurio senex LR/lc
    - Genus: Chiroderma
      - Salvin's big-eyed bat, Chiroderma salvini LR/lc
      - Little big-eyed bat, Chiroderma trinitatum LR/lc
      - Hairy big-eyed bat, Chiroderma villosum LR/lc
    - Genus: Ectophylla
      - Honduran white bat, Ectophylla alba LR/nt
    - Genus: Enchisthenes
      - Velvety fruit-eating bat, Enchisthenes hartii LR/lc
    - Genus: Mesophylla
      - MacConnell's bat, Mesophylla macconnelli LR/lc
    - Genus: Sphaeronycteris
      - Visored bat, Sphaeronycteris toxophyllum LR/lc
    - Genus: Sturnira
      - Aratathomas's yellow-shouldered bat, Sturnira aratathomasi LR/nt
      - Bidentate yellow-shouldered bat, Sturnira bidens LR/nt
      - Bogota yellow-shouldered bat, Sturnira bogotensis LR/lc
      - Hairy yellow-shouldered bat, Sturnira erythromos LR/lc
      - Little yellow-shouldered bat, Sturnira lilium LR/lc
      - Highland yellow-shouldered bat, Sturnira ludovici LR/lc
      - Louis's yellow-shouldered bat, Sturnira luisi LR/lc
      - Greater yellow-shouldered bat, Sturnira magna LR/nt
      - Talamancan yellow-shouldered bat, Sturnira mordax LR/nt
      - Tilda's yellow-shouldered bat, Sturnira tildae LR/lc
    - Genus: Uroderma
      - Tent-making bat, Uroderma bilobatum LR/lc
      - Brown tent-making bat, Uroderma magnirostrum LR/lc
    - Genus: Vampyressa
      - Bidentate yellow-eared bat, Vampyressa bidens LR/nt
      - Brock's yellow-eared bat, Vampyressa brocki LR/nt
      - Melissa's yellow-eared bat, Vampyressa melissa LR/nt
      - Striped yellow-eared bat, Vampyressa nymphaea LR/lc
      - Southern little yellow-eared bat, Vampyressa pusilla LR/lc
    - Genus: Vampyrodes
      - Great stripe-faced bat, Vampyrodes caraccioli LR/lc
    - Genus: Platyrrhinus
      - Eldorado broad-nosed bat, Platyrrhinus aurarius LR/nt
      - Short-headed broad-nosed bat, Platyrrhinus brachycephalus LR/lc
      - Choco broad-nosed bat, Platyrrhinus chocoensis VU
      - Thomas's broad-nosed bat, Platyrrhinus dorsalis LR/lc
      - Heller's broad-nosed bat, Platyrrhinus helleri LR/lc
      - Buffy broad-nosed bat, Platyrrhinus infuscus LR/nt
      - White-lined broad-nosed bat, Platyrrhinus lineatus LR/lc
      - Shadowy broad-nosed bat, Platyrrhinus umbratus LR/nt
      - Greater broad-nosed bat, Platyrrhinus vittatus LR/lc
  - Subfamily: Desmodontinae
    - Genus: Desmodus
      - Common vampire bat, Desmodus rotundus LR/lc
    - Genus: Diaemus
      - White-winged vampire bat, Diaemus youngi LR/lc
    - Genus: Diphylla
      - Hairy-legged vampire bat, Diphylla ecaudata LR/nt
- Family: Natalidae
  - Genus: Chilonatalus
    - Cuban funnel-eared bat, Chilonatalus micropus LR/lc
- Family: Furipteridae
  - Genus: Furipterus
    - Thumbless bat, Furipterus horrens LR/lc
- Family: Thyropteridae
  - Genus: Thyroptera
    - Peters's disk-winged bat, Thyroptera discifera LR/lc
    - Spix's disk-winged bat, Thyroptera tricolor LR/lc

==== Order: Cetacea (whales) ====
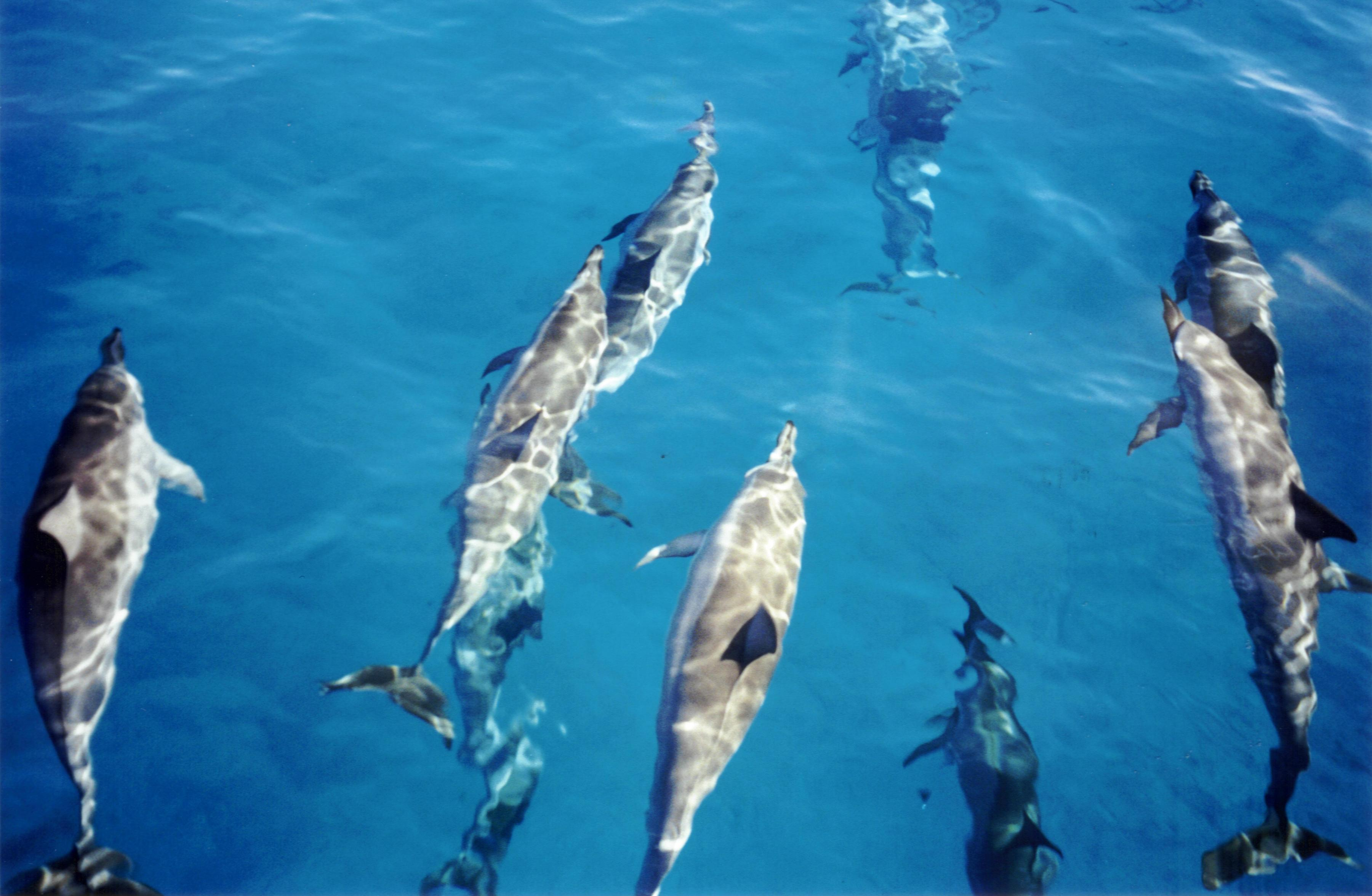
Spinner dolphins

The order Cetacea includes whales, dolphins and porpoises. They are the mammals most fully adapted to aquatic life with a spindle-shaped nearly hairless body, protected by a thick layer of blubber, and forelimbs and tail modified to provide propulsion underwater.

- Suborder: Mysticeti
  - Family: Balaenopteridae (baleen whales)
    - Genus: Balaenoptera
      - Common minke whale, Balaenoptera acutorostrata
      - Sei whale, Balaenoptera borealis
      - Bryde's whale, Balaenoptera brydei
      - Blue whale, Balaenoptera musculus
    - Genus: Megaptera
      - Humpback whale, Megaptera novaeangliae
- Suborder: Odontoceti
  - Superfamily: Platanistoidea
    - Family: Delphinidae (marine dolphins)
      - Genus: Delphinus
        - Short-beaked common dolphin, Delphinus delphis DD
      - Genus: Feresa
        - Pygmy killer whale, Feresa attenuata DD
      - Genus: Globicephala
        - Short-finned pilot whale, Globicephala macrorhyncus DD
      - Genus: Lagenodelphis
        - Fraser's dolphin, Lagenodelphis hosei DD
      - Genus: Grampus
        - Risso's dolphin, Grampus griseus DD
      - Genus: Orcinus
        - Killer whale, Orcinus orca DD
      - Genus: Peponocephala
        - Melon-headed whale, Peponocephala electra DD
      - Genus: Pseudorca
        - False killer whale, Pseudorca crassidens DD
      - Genus: Sotalia
        - Guiana dolphin, Sotalia guianensis DD
        - Tucuxi, Sotalia fluviatilis DD
        - Amazon river dolphin, Sotalia geoffrensis DD
      - Genus: Stenella
        - Pantropical spotted dolphin, Stenella attenuata DD
        - Clymene dolphin, Stenella clymene DD
        - Striped dolphin, Stenella coeruleoalba DD
        - Atlantic spotted dolphin, Stenella frontalis DD
        - Spinner dolphin, Stenella longirostris DD
      - Genus: Steno
        - Rough-toothed dolphin, Steno bredanensis DD
      - Genus: Tursiops
        - Common bottlenose dolphin, Tursiops truncatus
    - Family: Physeteridae (sperm whales)
      - Genus: Physeter
        - Sperm whale, Physeter catodon DD
    - Family: Kogiidae (dwarf sperm whales)
      - Genus: Kogia
        - Pygmy sperm whale, Kogia breviceps DD
        - Dwarf sperm whale, Kogia sima DD
  - Superfamily Ziphioidea
    - Family: Ziphidae (beaked whales)
      - Genus: Mesoplodon
        - Gervais' beaked whale, Mesoplodon europaeus DD
        - Ginkgo-toothed beaked whale, Mesoplodon ginkgodens DD
        - Pygmy beaked whale, Mesoplodon peruvianus DD
      - Genus: Ziphius
        - Cuvier's beaked whale, Ziphius cavirostris DD

==== Order: Carnivora (carnivorans) ====
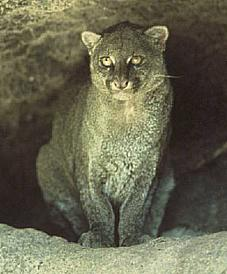
Jaguarundi

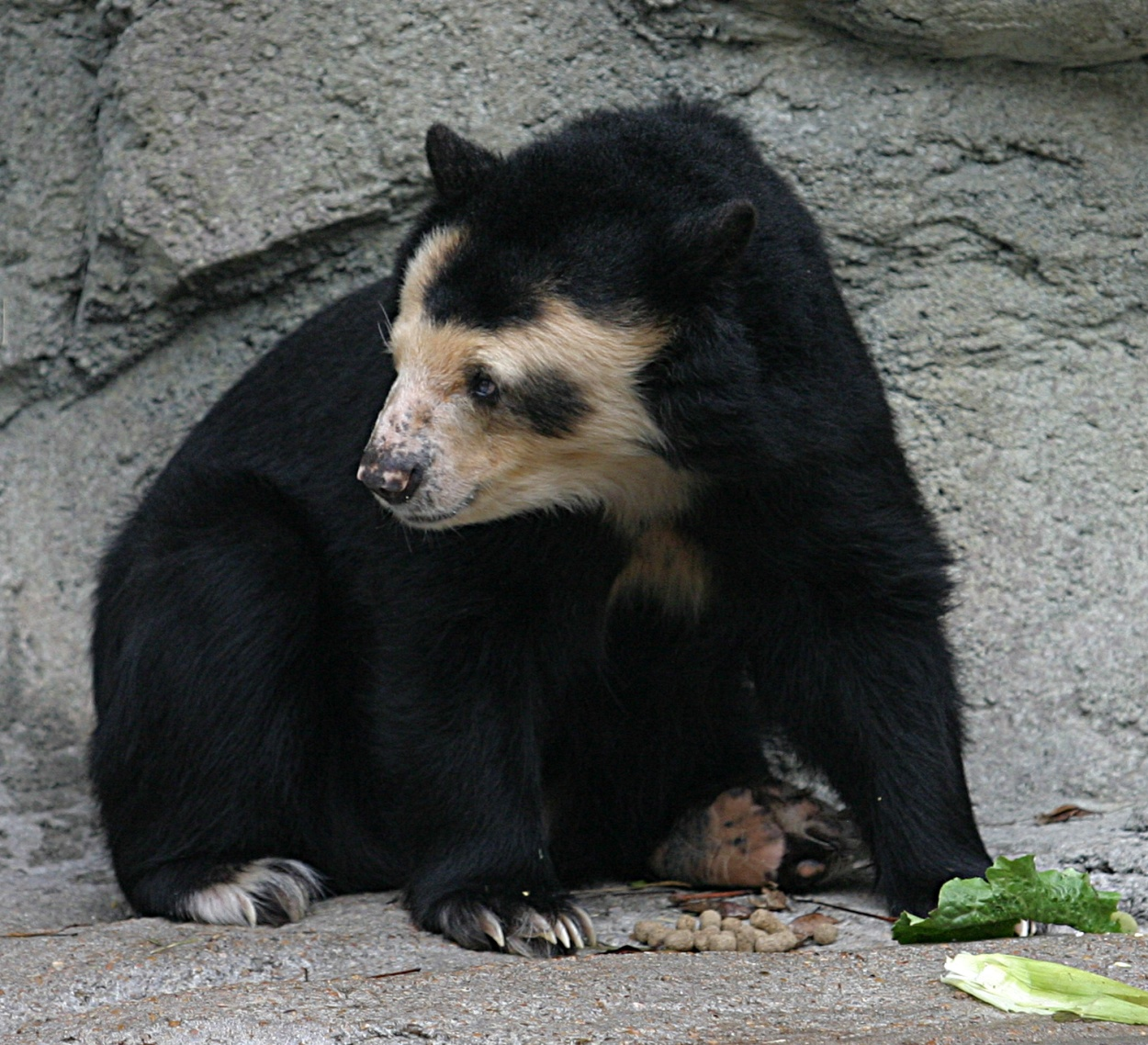
Spectacled bear

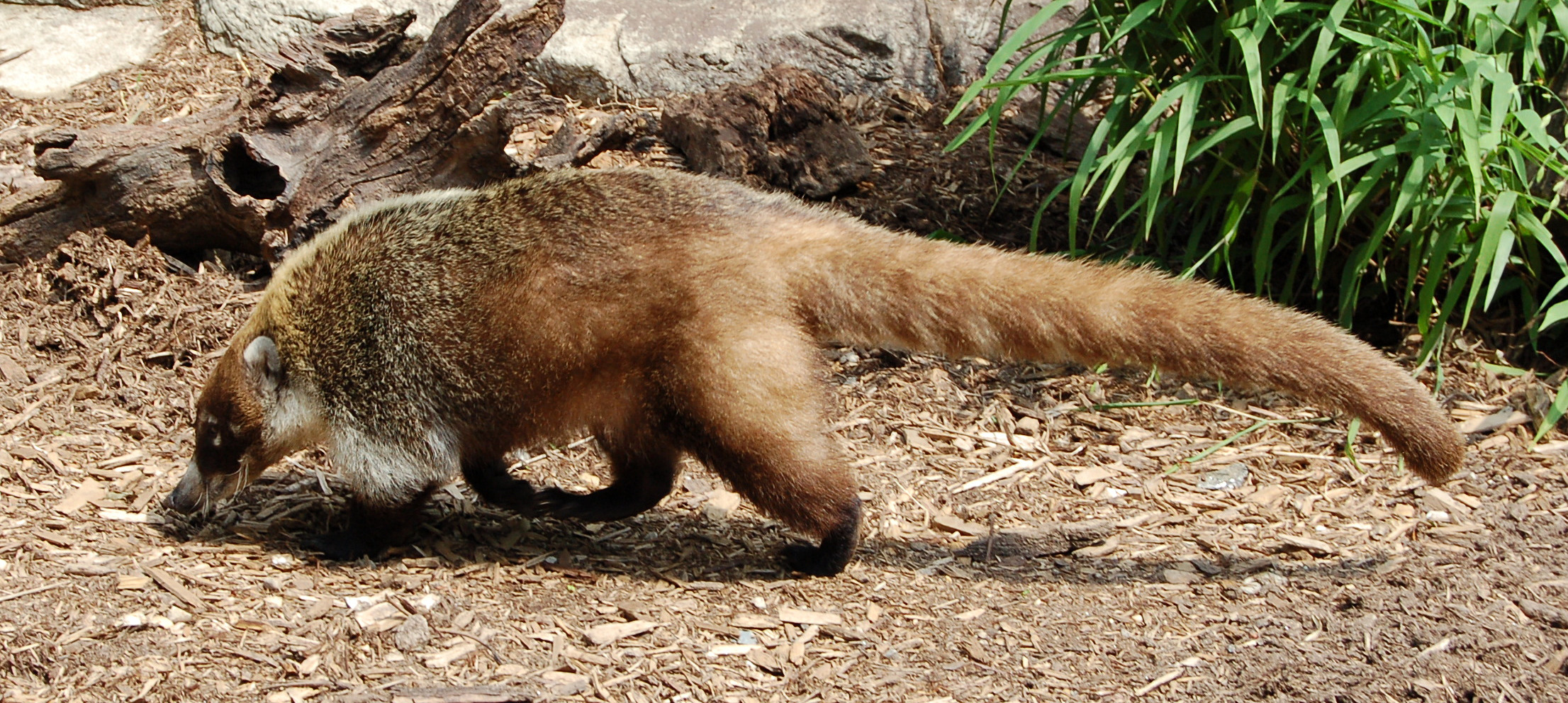
White-nosed coati

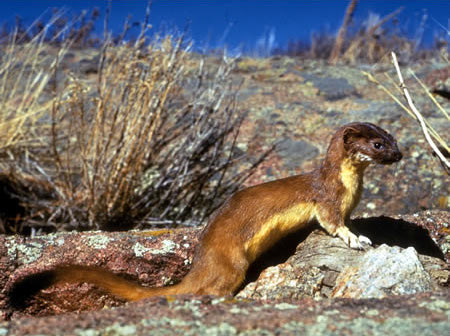
Long-tailed weasel

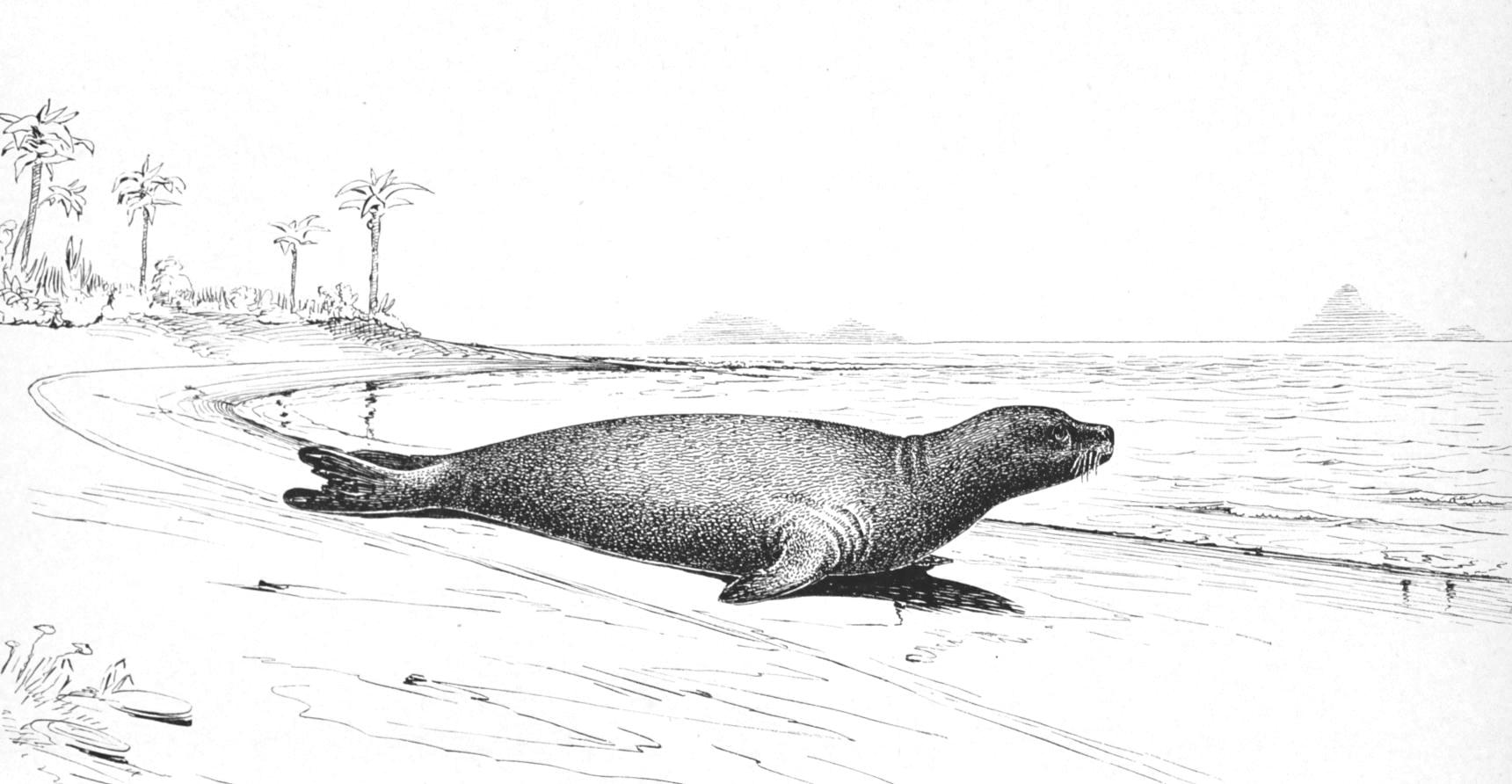
Caribbean monk seal

There are over 260 species of carnivores, the majority of which eat meat as their primary dietary item. They have a characteristic skull shape and dentition.

- Suborder: Feliformia
  - Family: Felidae (cats)
    - Subfamily: Felinae
      - Genus: Herpailurus
        - Jaguarundi, H. yagouaroundi LC
      - Genus: Leopardus
        - Pampas cat L. colocola NT presence uncertain
        - Ocelot L. pardalis LC
        - Oncilla L. tigrinus VU
        - Margay L. wiedii NT
      - Genus: Puma
        - Cougar, P. concolor LC
    - Subfamily: Pantherinae
      - Genus: Panthera
        - Jaguar, P. onca NT
- Suborder: Caniformia
  - Family: Canidae (dogs, foxes)
    - Genus: Atelocynus
      - Short-eared dog, Atelocynus microtis NT
    - Genus: Cerdocyon
      - Crab-eating fox, Cerdocyon thous LC
    - Genus: Lycalopex
      - Culpeo, Lycalopex culpaeus LC
    - Genus: Speothos
      - Bush dog, Speothos venaticus VU
    - Genus: Urocyon
      - Gray fox, Urocyon cinereoargenteus LC
  - Family: Ursidae (bears)
    - Genus: Tremarctos
      - Spectacled bear, Tremarctos ornatus VU
  - Family: Procyonidae (raccoons)
    - Genus: Bassaricyon
      - Eastern lowland olingo, Bassaricyon alleni
      - Western lowland olingo, Bassaricyon medius LC
      - Olinguito, Bassaricyon neblina NT
    - Genus: Nasua
      - White-nosed coati, Nasua narica LC
      - South American coati, Nasua nasua LC
    - Genus: Nasuella
      - Mountain coati, Nasuella olivacea NT
    - Genus: Potos
      - Kinkajou, Potos flavus LC
    - Genus: Procyon
      - Crab-eating raccoon, Procyon cancrivorus LC
  - Family: Mustelidae (mustelids)
    - Genus: Eira
      - Tayra, Eira barbara LC
    - Genus: Galictis
      - Greater grison, Galictis vittata LC
    - Genus: Lontra
      - Neotropical river otter, Lontra longicaudis NT
    - Genus: Neogale
      - Amazon weasel, N. africana LC
      - Colombian weasel, N. felipei VU
      - Long-tailed weasel, N. frenata LC
    - Genus: Pteronura
      - Giant otter, Pteronura brasiliensis EN
  - Family: Mephitidae
    - Genus: Conepatus
      - Striped hog-nosed skunk, Conepatus semistriatus
  - Family: Phocidae (earless seals)
    - Genus: Mirounga
      - Southern elephant seal, Mirounga leonina LC vagrant
    - Genus: Neomonachus
      - Caribbean monk seal, Neomonachus tropicalis EX
  - Family: Otariidae
    - Genus: Otaria
      - South American sea lion, Otaria flavescens occasional visitor
    - Genus: Arctocephalus
      - South American fur seal, Arctocephalus australis LC vagrant
      - Galápagos fur seal, Arctocephalus galapagoensis EN
      - Juan Fernández fur seal, Arctocephalus philippii NT vagrant
    - Genus: Zalophus
      - Galápagos sea lion, Zalophus wollebaeki EN

==== Order: Perissodactyla (odd-toed ungulates) ====
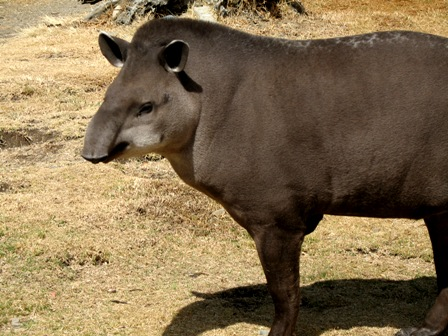
Brazilian tapir

The odd-toed ungulates are browsing and grazing mammals. They are usually large to very large, and have relatively simple stomachs and a large middle toe.

- Family: Tapiridae (tapirs)
  - Genus: Tapirus
    - Baird's tapir, Tapirus bairdii EN
    - Mountain tapir, Tapirus pinchaque EN
    - Brazilian tapir, Tapirus terrestris VU

==== Order: Artiodactyla (even-toed ungulates) ====
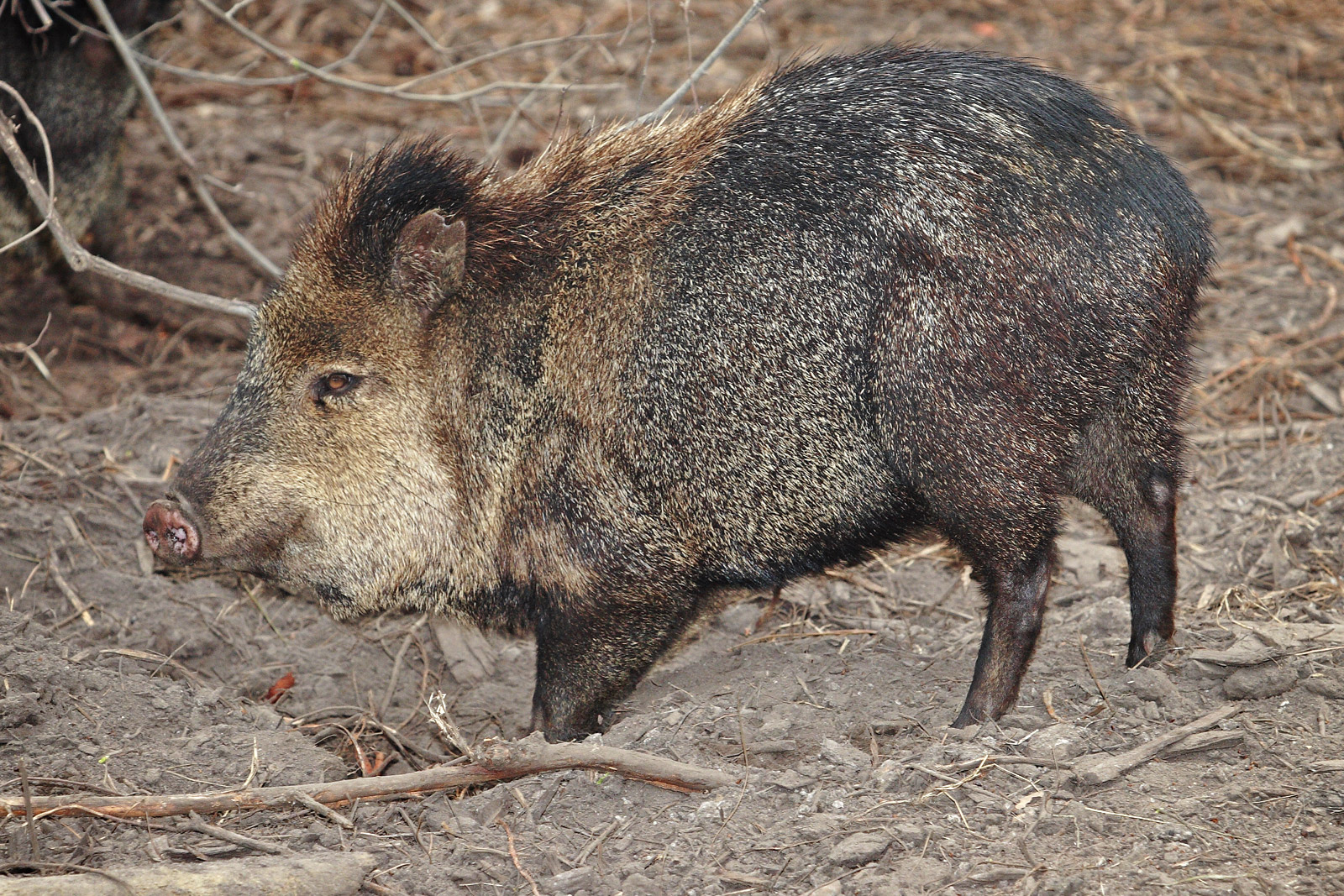
Collared peccary

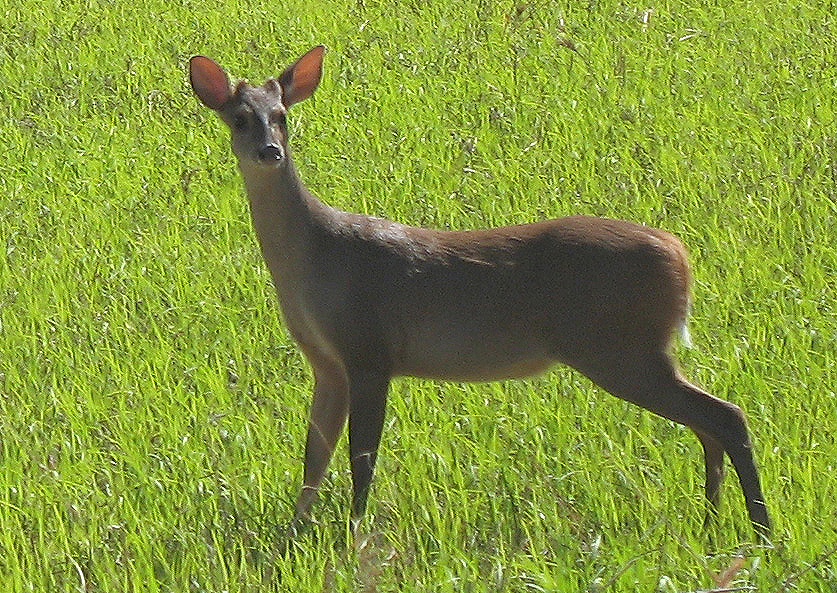
Red brocket

The even-toed ungulates are ungulates whose weight is borne about equally by the third and fourth toes, rather than mostly or entirely by the third as in perissodactyls. There are about 220 artiodactyl species, including many that are of great economic importance to humans.

- Family: Cervidae (deer)
  - Subfamily: Capreolinae
    - Genus: Mazama
      - Red brocket, Mazama americana DD
      - Merida brocket, Mazama bricenii VU
      - Amazonian brown brocket, Mazama nemorivaga LC
      - Little red brocket, Mazama rufina LR/nt
      - Central American red brocket, Mazama temama DD
    - Genus: Odocoileus
      - White-tailed deer, O. virginianus LC
    - Genus: Pudu
      - Pudu, Pudu mephistophiles DD
- Family: Camelidae (camels, llamas)
  - Genus: Lama
    - Guanaco, Lama guanicoe LC extirpated
- Family: Hippopotamidae (hippopotamus)
  - Genus: Hippopotamus
    - Hippopotamus, Hippopotamus amphibius VU introduced
- Family: Tayassuidae (peccaries)
  - Genus: Dicotyles
    - Collared peccary, Dicotyles tajacu LC
  - Genus: Tayassu
    - White-lipped peccary, Tayassu pecari NT

== See also ==
- List of chordate orders
- Lists of mammals by region
- List of prehistoric mammals
- Mammal classification
- List of mammals described in the 2000s
