= M. minutus =

M. minutus may refer to:

- Micromys minutus, the harvest mouse, a small rodent species native to Europe and Asia
- Microryzomys minutus, the montane colilargo or forest small rice rat, a rodent species found in Bolivia, Colombia, Ecuador, Peru and Venezuela

== See also ==
- List of Latin and Greek words commonly used in systematic names#M
