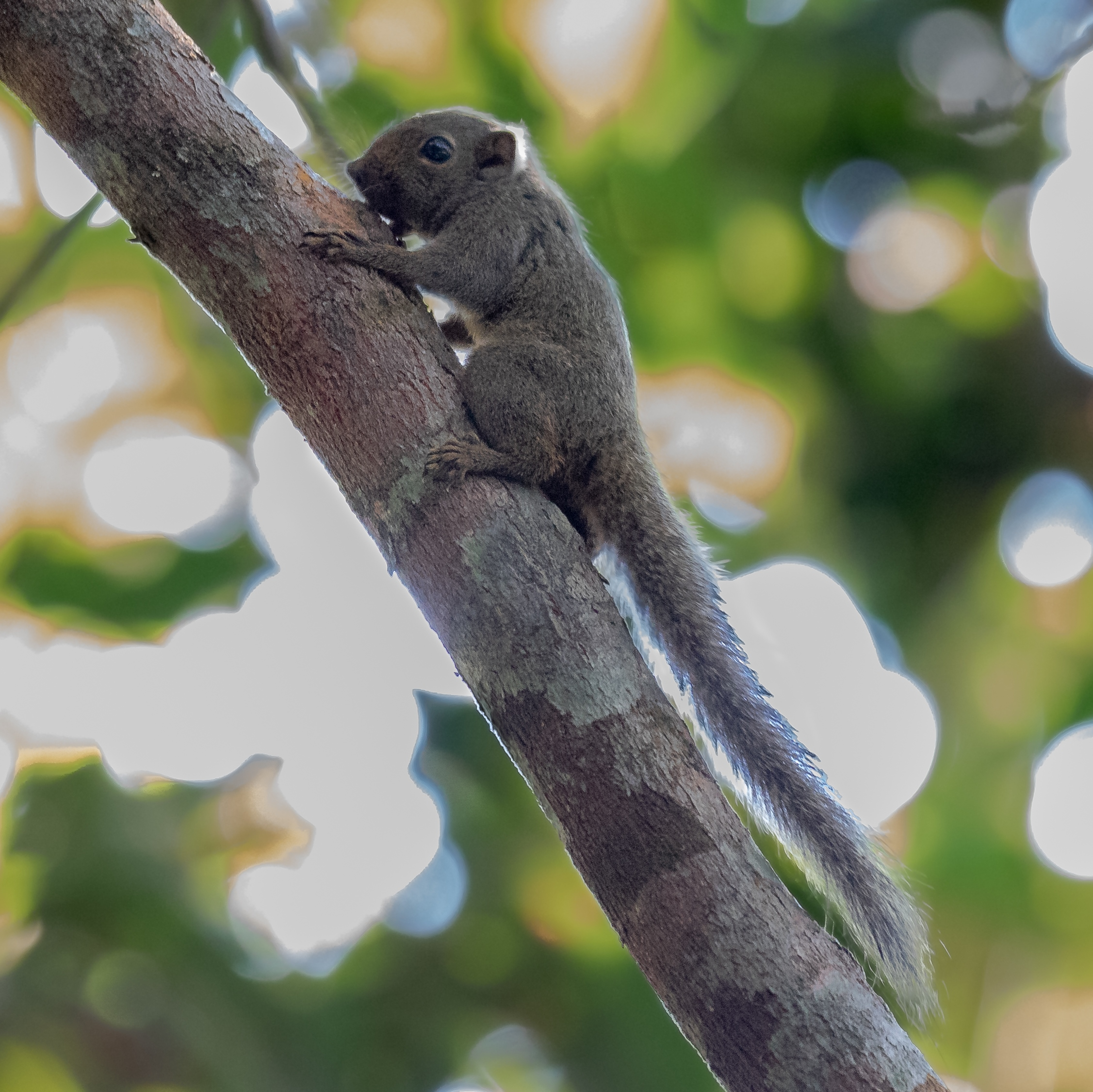

Conservation status
- Least Concern (IUCN 3.1)

Scientific classification
- Kingdom: Animalia
- Phylum: Chordata
- Class: Mammalia
- Order: Rodentia
- Family: Sciuridae
- Genus: Microsciurus
- Species: M. flaviventer

Binomial name
- Microsciurus flaviventer (J.E. Gray, 1867)
- Amazon dwarf squirrel range

= Amazon dwarf squirrel =

Species of rodent

The Amazon dwarf squirrel (Microsciurus flaviventer) is a chipmunk-sized tree squirrel native to South America.

== Description ==
As its name suggests, the Amazon dwarf squirrel is relatively small, with a head-body length of 12 to 16 cm (4.7 to 6.3 in) and a tail 8 to 16 cm (3.1 to 6.3 in) long. Adults weigh between 86 and 132 g (3.0 and 4.7 oz), with males being slightly larger than females. The fur varies from reddish to dull brown, fading gradually to yellow or greyish on the underparts. There is a distinctive patch of pale yellow fur behind the ears, while the tail has faint yellowish bands and white frosting.

The limbs are unusually long for tree squirrels. In the forelimbs, the humerus and radius are of equal length, an adaptation thought to increase the squirrel's ability to climb large trees, compensating for a lack of shoulder mobility. The longer hindlimbs allow for stronger muscles, so that the squirrel can leap over larger gaps, relative to its size, than more typically sized squirrels can.

== Distribution and habitat ==
The squirrels are found in the upper Amazon Basin, broadly west of the Purus and Rio Negro rivers, in Brazil, Bolivia, Peru, Ecuador, and Colombia. They typically inhabit evergreen tropical rainforests at up to 2,000 m (6,600 ft) elevation, although they may sometimes be found in more disturbed habitats.

=== Subspecies ===
Eight subspecies of Amazon dwarf squirrel are generally recognised. Recent studies have indicated that the subspecies M. f. otinus, M. f. sabanillae, M. f. similis, and M. f. simonsi are their own distinct species rather than subspecies. The same study also showed that M. f. otinus and M. f. similis are more closely related to Microsciurus mimulus and Sciurus pucheranii than they are to M. flaviventer.

Microsciurus flaviventer taxonomy
Subspecies	Authority	Synonyms	Distribution
M. f. flaviventer	Gray (1867)	manarius	Western Brazil, northeastern Peru
M. f. napi	Thomas (1900)	avunculus, florenciae	Northeastern Ecuador
M. f. otinus	Thomas (1901)	none	Western Colombia
M. f. peruanus	J. A. Allen (1897)	none	Northern Peru
M. f. rubrirostris	J. A. Allen (1914)	rubicollis	Southern Peru
M. f. sabanillae	Anthony (1922)	none	Southern Ecuador
M. f. similis	Nelson (1899)	none	Far western Colombia
M. f. simonsi	Thomas (1900)	none	Central eastern Ecuador

== Biology and behaviour ==
The squirrels use all levels of the forest, from the ground to the tree canopy, but are most commonly found in the understory. They feed on arthropods, tree bark, and fungi, and have been observed to closely follow flocks of birds while foraging, although the reason for this is unclear. They are diurnal and highly arboreal, even for tree squirrels, frequently jumping from branch to branch. They spend the night in nests formed from plant fibres, and located several metres above the ground.

They are mostly solitary, but may be found with others feeding on the same tree. Their calls include a bird-like "trill" and a series of soft "chucks" used as an alarm call. Very little is known of their reproduction, although litters are thought to be small.

== Bibliography ==
- Tirira, Diego. 2006. Mamíferos del Ecuador, Diversidad: Microsciurus flaviventer (Gray, 1867). Page on internet (Enero 2006). Version 1.1. Ediciones Murciélago Blanco. Quito. Mamiferos del Equador Checked on: fecha de visita (2009-03-17)
