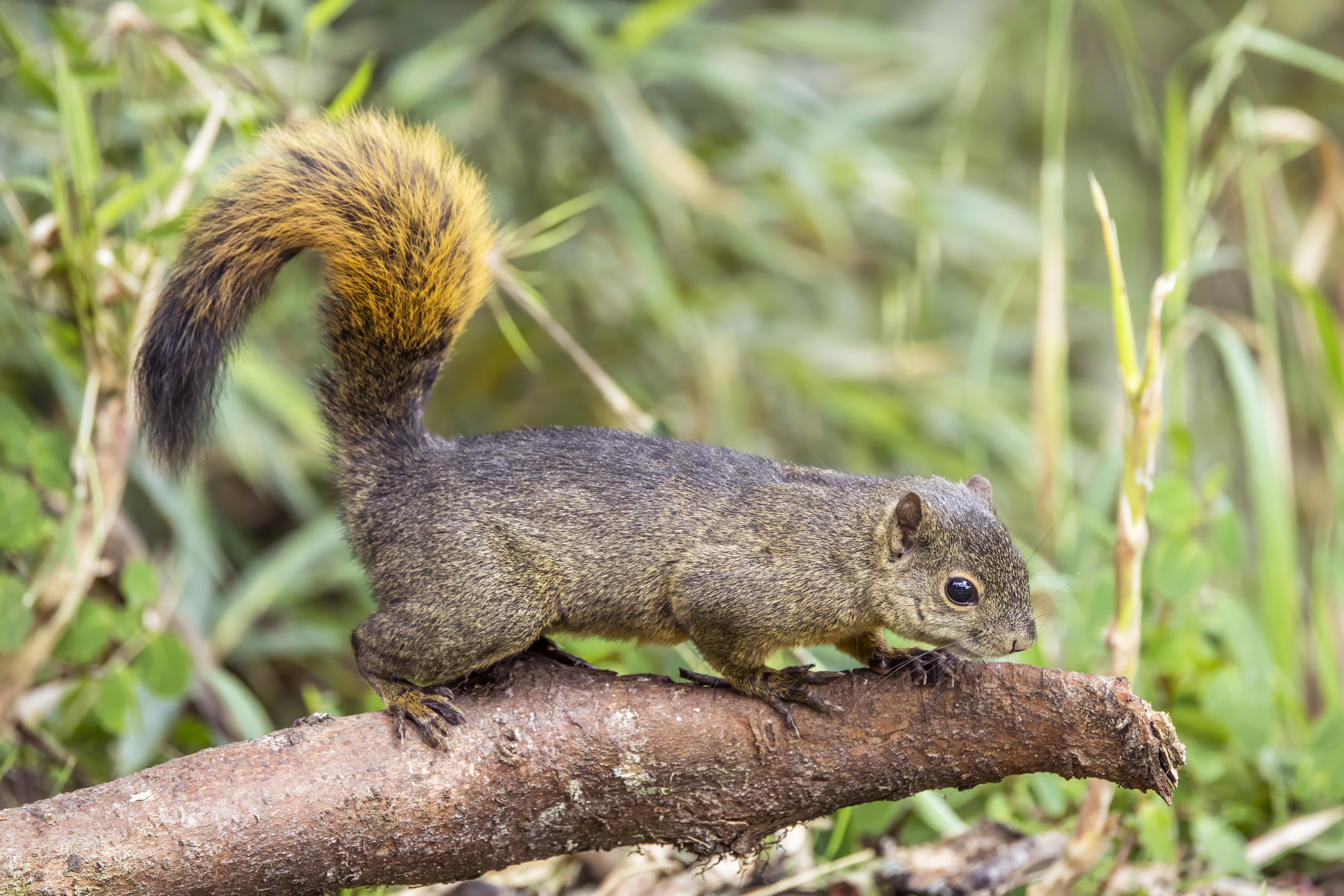
- S. g. chrysuros, Caldas, Colombia

Conservation status
- Least Concern (IUCN 3.1)

Scientific classification
- Kingdom: Animalia
- Phylum: Chordata
- Class: Mammalia
- Order: Rodentia
- Family: Sciuridae
- Genus: Sciurus
- Species: S. granatensis

Binomial name
- Sciurus granatensis (Humboldt, 1811)
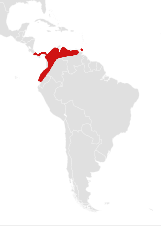
- Distribution of the red-tailed squirrel

Synonyms
- Notosciurus granatensis

= Red-tailed squirrel =

Species of rodent

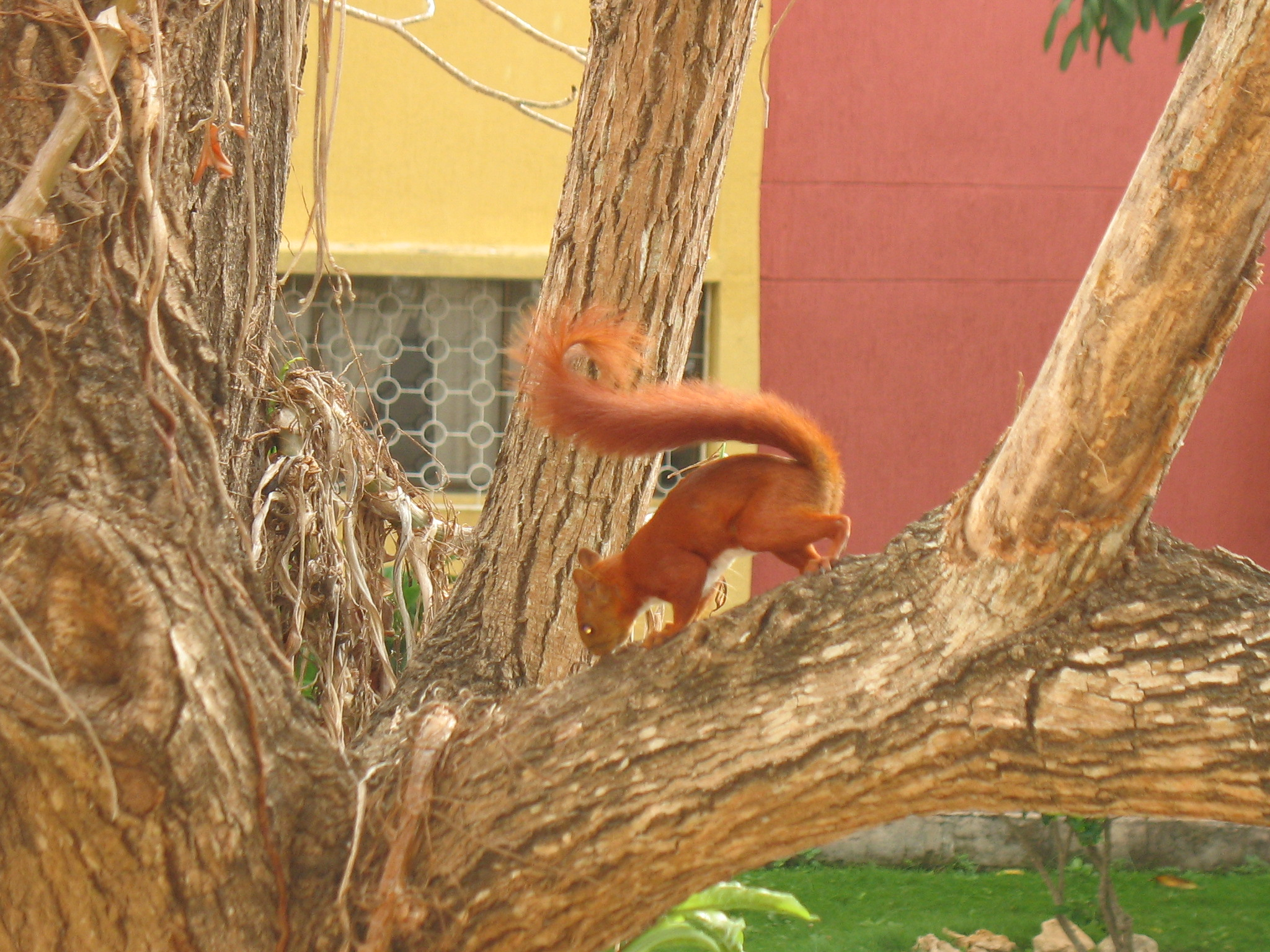
color variant from Barranquilla, Colombia

The red-tailed squirrel (Sciurus granatensis) is a species of tree squirrel distributed from southern Central America to northern South America.

== Distribution ==
It is found in Central and South America (Colombia, Costa Rica, Ecuador, Panama, and Venezuela) and the Caribbean islands of Trinidad and Tobago and Margarita. According to the Global Register of Introduced and Invasive Species it has also been introduced and is invasive in Cuba, however this refers to a small population found around some parts of the margin of Rio Almendares in Havana that escaped from the Havana Zoo.

== Habitat ==
Ranges from 0 to 3,000 m (0 to 9,843 ft) in elevation. It inhabits many types of forests, and can be found in picnic grounds.

== Taxonomy ==
It was recently reclassified as Notosciurus granatensis in 2015, Notosciurus being a genus created in 1914 by Joel Asaph Allen for a juvenile of this species. However, the IUCN still puts it as a member of the genus Sciurus.

== Infraspecific variability ==
This is an extremely variable species in terms of coat colours. As such numerous former species and subspecies have been named from within its range, often from the same locality. Over the years many species were moved into subspecies of this taxon. In 1961 Cabrera recognised 28 subspecies. Other subspecies were subsequently added, such as Sciurus llanensis which was named from southern Venezuela in 1984 and later sank into Sciurus granatensis as a subspecies, so that by the early 2000s 32 subspecies were recognised. In 2015 these were reduced to 6 geographical subspecies. Koprowski, Mercer and Roth writing for the IUCN in 2008, however, claimed the species should perhaps be split into a number of species based on never published morphological and genetic research.

- S. granatensis ssp. chapmani - Found in Trinidad, Tobago, and the neighbouring coast of Venezuela, occurring at all elevations within this range. 1 synonym from old subspecies: chapmani. Subspecies tobagensis and quebradensis were brought into synonymy before 1961. Distinguished by the lack of orange fur patches behind the ears. Otherwise dark brown with orange streaks on the head, orange throat, chest and belly different colour than the sides, dark brown tail with the tips of the hairs red. The orange hairs of the abdomen have a grey base.
- S. granatensis ssp. chrysuros - Found on the eastern slopes of the Andes in Venezuela, Colombia and Ecuador (to the border with Peru). 12 synonyms from old subspecies: candalensis, carchensis, chrysuros, ferminae, griseimembra, griseogena, imbaburae, llanensis, meridensis, soederstroemi, sumaco, and tarrae. Distinguished by brown or dark brown crown of the head, back, and base of the tail; light yellow to red streaks on the head and back; sometimes a black line down the middle of the back; inconspicuous pale orange patches behind the ears; reddish-orange throat to belly, sometimes with white spots; the majority of the end of the tail with hairs coloured orange to reddish (or both in different bands) at their tip, sometimes with the tip of the tail coloured black.
- S. granatensis ssp. granatensis - Occurs at high elevations in the western Andes of Colombia to the Sierra de Santa Marta, and across the central and eastern cordilleras of Colombia to western Venezuela, also in the lowlands around Lake Maracaibo. 13 synonyms from old subspecies: agricolae, bondae, gerrardi, granatensis, maracaibensis, norosiensis, perijae, quindianus, saltuensis, splendidus, valdiviae, variabilis, and zuliae. Distinguished by being larger than the other subspecies; patches behind the ears prominent; the back sometimes patterned with different colours brown, red, orange, sometimes blackish patterns of varying sizes near the tail (especially in the south), although sometimes the back is uniformly orange (especially in the north); sometimes a red or orange cap on the head or further down; throat, chest and belly may range from completely red (especially in the south), completely white (especially in the north), orange with white spots or patches of varying sizes, sometimes a line or lines of white dots down the middle of the belly.
- S. granatensis ssp. hoffmanni - Native to western Panama and throughout Costa Rica up to the border of Nicaragua. 2 synonyms from old subspecies: chiriquensis (Panama, Costa Rica) and hoffmanni (Panama). Distinguished by a reddish back and tail streaked with yellow or orange, and an orange belly with hairs having a grey base.
- S. granatensis ssp. morulus - Occurs from the Panama Canal Zone south to western Colombia and northwestern Ecuador. 3 synonyms from old subspecies: manavi, morulus, and versicolor. Distinguished by usually lacking different coloured patches behind the ears (except in forms from Ecuador); the middle of the back is very dark brown, especially in Colombia, less so in Panama; red throat, chest and belly with the hairs completely red; tail tricoloured with a dark base, large reddish middle band and black end.
- S. granatensis ssp. nesaeus - An insular subspecies endemic to Isla de Margarita. 1 synonym from old subspecies: nesaeus. Distinguished by brown head and back heavily streaked with orange; inconspicuous orange patches behind the ears; reddish-orange throat, chest and belly with the hairs entirely reddish-orange; colour of the belly sharply set off from the colour of the sides; tail with brown base with the greater portion near the end having the hairs washed with reddish-orange tips.

== Similar species ==
It is most closely related to Sciurus pucheranii in South America. It is somewhat larger than this species, although the sizes overlap, except where the two species occur sympatrically in the eastern Andes of Colombia where S. granatensis is always noticeably larger. These two species are the only two squirrels of South America which possess 3 pairs of teats and a patch of lighter coloured (generally orange) fur on the head behind the ears (except the subspecies morulus and chapmani). It is also closely related to Sciurus richmondi of Nicaragua, which replaces S. granatensis ssp. hoffmanni to the north of Costa Rica. This species is a bit smaller, similar in colouration to S. granatensis ssp. hoffmanni but a bit duller, with the orange streaks on the tail coloured more pale. S. richmondi is likely conspecific with Sciurus granatensis.

== Conservation ==
This is a common squirrel with a stable population and a vast range consisting of different habitats, including human influenced environments, thus it is not thought to be at threat. In 2008, the IUCN hinted at that should the species be split into different species; some of these could be deemed threatened.

It has been introduced to a small area near Havana on Cuba, where it is not native. No damage to the native fauna has been reported.
