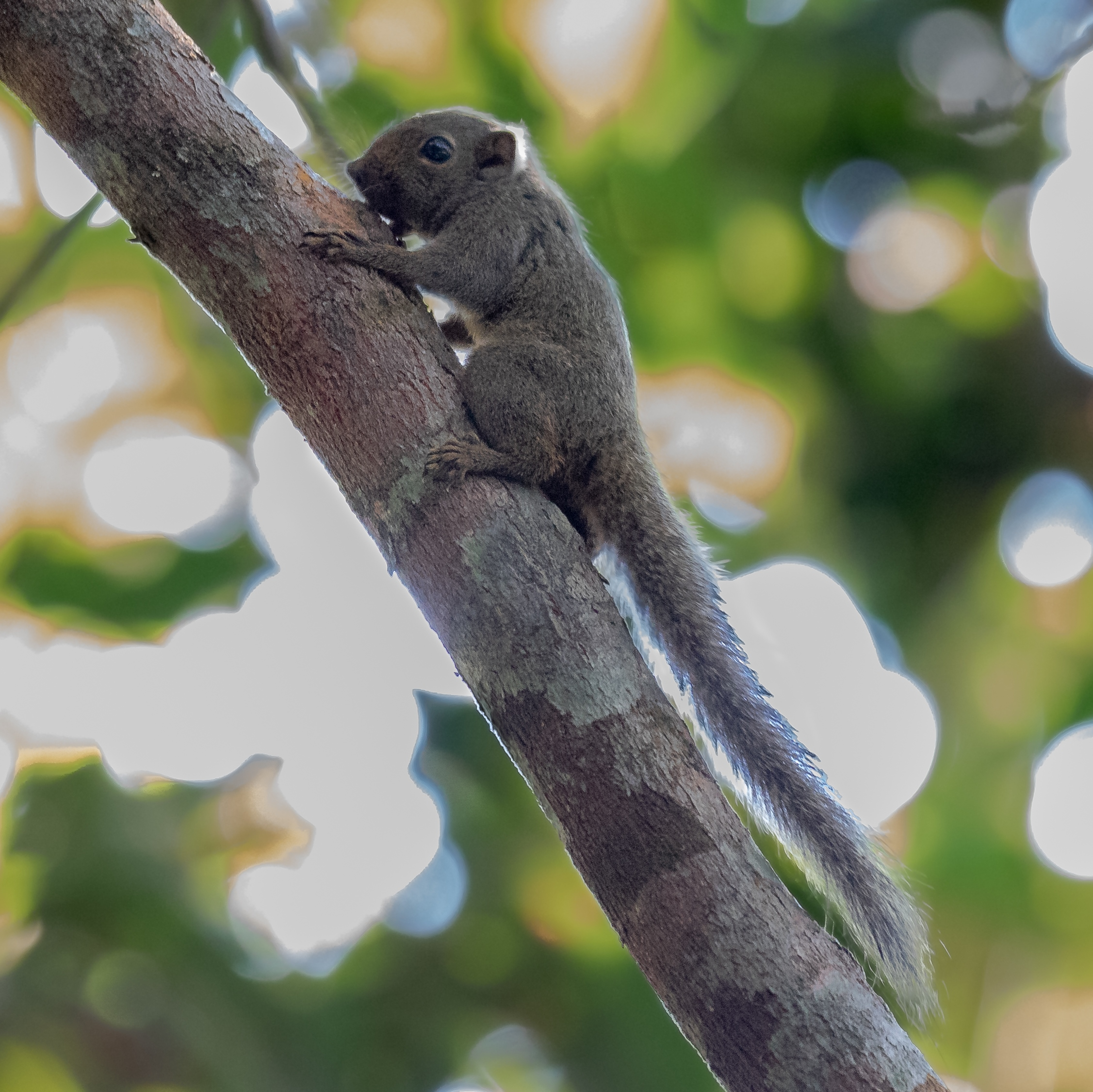
- Microsciurus flaviventer

Scientific classification
- Kingdom: Animalia
- Phylum: Chordata
- Class: Mammalia
- Order: Rodentia
- Family: Sciuridae
- Subfamily: Sciurinae
- Tribe: Sciurini
- Genus: Microsciurus; J. A. Allen, 1895

Type species
- Sciurus alfari J. A. Allen, 1895

Species
- See text

= Microsciurus =

Genus of rodents

Microsciurus or dwarf squirrels is a genus of squirrels from the tropical regions of Central and South America.

== Taxonomy and systematics ==
Recent DNA analysis has shown that there is some confusion regarding the traditional classification of the species in the genus Microsciurus, and that the genus may be polyphyletic. Currently, there are four species recognized:

- Central American dwarf squirrel (Microsciurus alfari) Allen, 1895, Costa Rica, Nicaragua, Panama, northern Colombia
- Amazon dwarf squirrel (Microsciurus flaviventer) Gray, 1867, western Amazon basin
- Western dwarf squirrel (Microsciurus mimulus) Thomas, 1898, Ecuador, Colombia, Panama
- Santander dwarf squirrel (Microsciurus santanderensis) Hernández-Camacho, 1957, central Colombia

A 2020 paper published on the taxonomy of Sciurinae split Microsciurus into three genera, one currently unnamed. The paper included genetic sampling from all species except Santander dwarf squirrel and (Microsciurus) simonsi. It suggests several new species, not all described.

- Microsciurus
  - Central American dwarf squirrel, M. alfari
  - Microsciurus "species 1" from Colombia
- Leptosciurus
  - Western dwarf squirrel, L. mimulus
  - Andean squirrel, L. pucheranii (moved from Sciurus)
  - Leptosciurus similis
  - Leptosciurus otinus
  - Leptosciurnus boquetensis
  - Leptosciurus isthmius
- "Microsciurus"
  - Amazon dwarf squirrel, "M." flaviventer
  - "Microsciurus" sabanillae
  - "Microsciurus" "species 2" from Peru and Brazil (previously assigned to Syntheosciurus)

== Description ==
With a typical head-and-body length of about 15 cm (5.9 in) and a 12 cm (4.7 in) long tail, dwarf squirrels are relatively small. However, the Neotropical pygmy squirrel, not in this genus, is much smaller than these species, as are certain squirrels in Africa and Asia. Microsciurus species have gray or brown backs, and white bellies.

== Distribution and habitat ==
All dwarf squirrels in this genus live in tropical rain forests. Estimates of their abundance are limited. The IUCN lists the conservation status as "Least Concern" for three of the species and "Data Deficient" for Microsciurus santanderensis.

== Bibliography ==
- Ronald M. Nowak: Walker's Mammals of the World. Johns Hopkins University Press, 1999 ISBN 0-8018-5789-9
