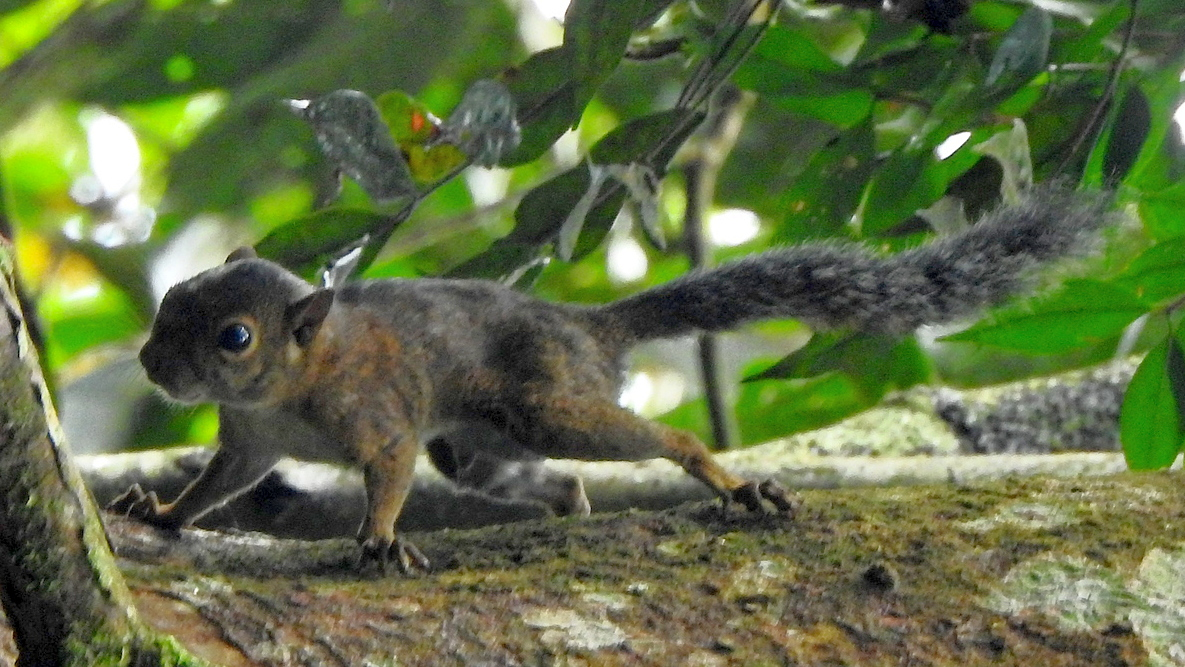

Conservation status
- Data Deficient (IUCN 3.1)

Scientific classification
- Kingdom: Animalia
- Phylum: Chordata
- Class: Mammalia
- Order: Rodentia
- Family: Sciuridae
- Genus: Microsciurus
- Species: M. santanderensis

Binomial name
- Microsciurus santanderensis (Hernandez-Camacho, 1957)
- range

= Santander dwarf squirrel =

Species of squirrel

The Santander dwarf squirrel (Microsciurus santanderensis) is a small tree squirrel endemic to Colombia.

== Description ==
The Santander dwarf squirrel is a small tree squirrel, measuring around 15 centimetres (5.9 in) from nose to rump, with a tail about the same length again. Females are, on average, slightly larger than males. Originally described as a subspecies of the Andean squirrel, it is similar to that species in appearance, but somewhat smaller. It has reddish-orange fur over most of the body, with a black line running down the centre of the back and paler, pinkish-buff underparts. There are also paler markings on the snout and around the eyes. The tail is long and thin; the fur on the tail is relatively short, rather than bushy, and is tipped with white but otherwise black above and paler below.

== Distribution and biology ==
The precise range of the Santander dwarf squirrel is unclear, since it is often confused with the Andean squirrel. It was originally described from Santander Department in Colombia but has since also been reported from further west. It is, however, only known definitively from a patch of land between the middle section of the Magdalena River and the western slopes of the Cordillera Oriental. This region varies from 100 to 3,800 metres (330 to 12,470 ft) in elevation and is heavily forested, with oak dominating in the higher altitudes and more varied humid forest in the lowlands.

Very little is known about the behaviour or biology of the species, beyond the fact that it lives in trees and appears to be diurnal. The absence of reliable information, even on the exact area that it inhabits, meant that, as of 2016, it was not possible to assess its population, conservation status or any threats it might face, and it is therefore listed as data deficient by the IUCN.
