= Oligoryzomys griseolus =

Conservation status
- Least Concern (IUCN 3.1)

Scientific classification
- Kingdom: Animalia
- Phylum: Chordata
- Class: Mammalia
- Order: Rodentia
- Family: Cricetidae
- Subfamily: Sigmodontinae
- Genus: Oligoryzomys
- Species: O. griseolus

Binomial name
- Oligoryzomys griseolus (Osgood, 1912)

Species of rodent

Oligoryzomys griseolus, also known as the grizzled colilargo or the grayish pygmy rice rat, is a species of rodent in the genus Oligoryzomys of family Cricetidae. It is found in the Andes of Venezuela and nearby Colombia. Its karyotype has 2n = 62 and FNa = 74–76.

== Literature cited ==
- Musser, G. G.; Carleton, M. D. (2005). "Superfamily Muroidea". In Wilson, D. E.; Reeder, D. M. (eds.). Mammal Species of the World: A Taxonomic and Geographic Reference (3rd ed.). Johns Hopkins University Press. pp. 894–1531. ISBN 978-0-8018-8221-0. OCLC 62265494.
