= Zygodontomys =

Zygodontomys Temporal range: Pleistocene - Recent

Scientific classification
- Domain: Eukaryota
- Kingdom: Animalia
- Phylum: Chordata
- Class: Mammalia
- Order: Rodentia
- Family: Cricetidae
- Subfamily: Sigmodontinae
- Tribe: Oryzomyini
- Genus: Zygodontomys; J.A. Allen, 1897

Type species
- Oryzomys cherriei J.A. Allen, 1895

Species
- Zygodontomys brevicauda Zygodontomys brunneus

Genus of rodents

Zygodontomys is a genus of rodent in the tribe Oryzomyini of the family Cricetidae. Its closest relative may be Scolomys. It ranges from Central America east to the Guianas. It contains two species: Zygodontomys brunneus and Zygodontomys brevicauda.
