= Zygodontomys brunneus =

Conservation status
- Least Concern (IUCN 3.1)

Scientific classification
- Kingdom: Animalia
- Phylum: Chordata
- Class: Mammalia
- Order: Rodentia
- Family: Cricetidae
- Subfamily: Sigmodontinae
- Genus: Zygodontomys
- Species: Z. brunneus

Binomial name
- Zygodontomys brunneus Thomas, 1898

Species of rodent

Zygodontomys brunneus, also known as the brown zygodont, brown cane mouse, or Colombian cane mouse, is a rodent species in the genus Zygodontomys of tribe Oryzomyini. It is found only in Colombia.

== Literature cited ==
- Duff, A. and Lawson, A. 2004. Mammals of the World: A checklist. Yale University Press, 312 pp. ISBN 978-0-300-10398-4
- Musser, G.G. and Carleton, M.D. 2005. Superfamily Muroidea. Pp. 894–1531 in Wilson, D.E. and Reeder, D.M. (eds.). Mammal Species of the World: a taxonomic and geographic reference. 3rd ed. Baltimore: The Johns Hopkins University Press, 2 vols., 2142 pp. ISBN 978-0-8018-8221-0
