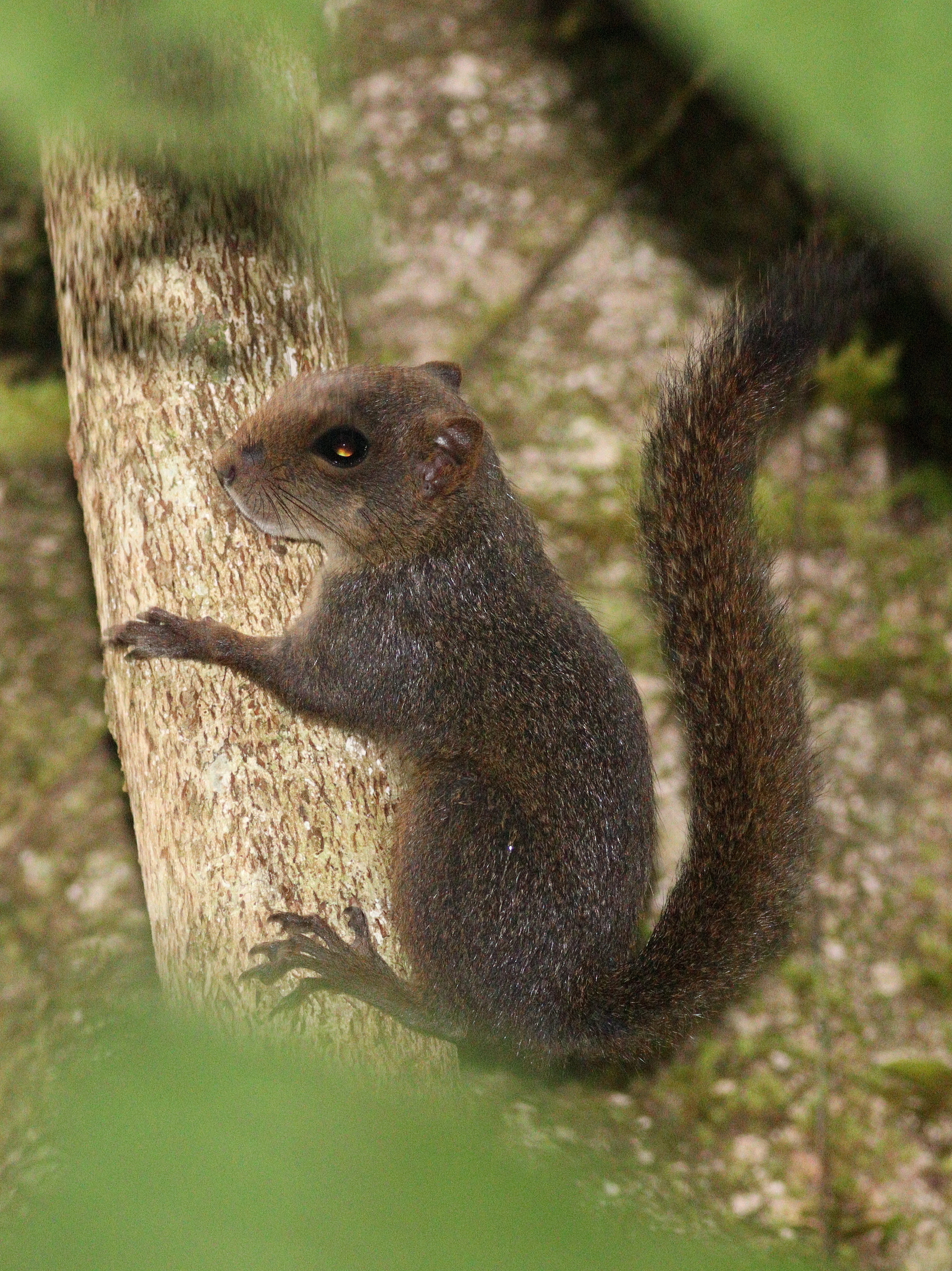

Conservation status
- Least Concern (IUCN 3.1)

Scientific classification
- Kingdom: Animalia
- Phylum: Chordata
- Class: Mammalia
- Order: Rodentia
- Family: Sciuridae
- Genus: Microsciurus
- Species: M. alfari

Binomial name
- Microsciurus alfari (J. A. Allen, 1895)

Subspecies
- M. a. alfari; M. a. alticola; M. a. browni; M. a. fusculus; M. a. septentrionalis; M. a. venustulus
- Central American dwarf squirrel range

= Central American dwarf squirrel =

Species of rodent

The Central American dwarf squirrel, also known as Alfaro's pygmy squirrel, (Microsciurus alfari) is a small tree squirrel in the genus Microsciurus and tribe Sciurini found in Colombia, Costa Rica, Nicaragua, and Panama. No species of squirrel within this genus are listed as endangered, however they are rarely seen because they are extremely elusive. This suggests that their population numbers may be larger than documented.

== Description ==
Central American dwarf squirrels are not as small as their name suggests. In fact, their body measurements are close to that of the red squirrel and gray squirrel, with a head-and-body length about 15 cm (5.9 in) with a 12 cm (4.7 in) long tail. The majority of their body is a dark, olive-green and brown color with a reddish-brown head coloration. The underside of their heads and limbs can range from a yellowish grey to a tawny grey color.

== Distribution and habitat ==
Central American dwarf squirrels are native to Colombia, Costa Rica, Nicaragua, and Panama. They typically inhabit tropical rainforests, with a preference for the heavy forest, particularly those with vines in the undergrowth, which can allow them to descend to the ground and quickly escape from predators.

== Ecology ==
Central American dwarf squirrels are typically very shy and solitary in nature. While they are diurnal some squirrels have been observed at night by hunters, suggesting a degree of nocturnal activity. Their small size, dull coloration, and quickness tend to make them hard to locate and catch or even observe. The diet of these squirrels is most likely similar that to the common herbivore, consisting of seeds, grains and nuts, including nuts of the ivory-nut palm tree which they inhabit.

== Subspecies ==
The table below lists the six recognized subspecies of M. alfari, along with any synonyms associated with each subspecies:

Microsciurus alfari taxonomy
| Subspecies | Authority | Synonyms |
|---|---|---|
| M. a. alfari | J. A. Allen (1895) | none |
| M. a. alticola | Goodwin (1943) | none |
| M. a. browni | Bangs (1902) | none |
| M. a. fusculus | Thomas (1910) | none |
| M. a. septentrionalis | Anthony (1920) | none |
| M. a. venustulus | Goldman (1912) | none |
