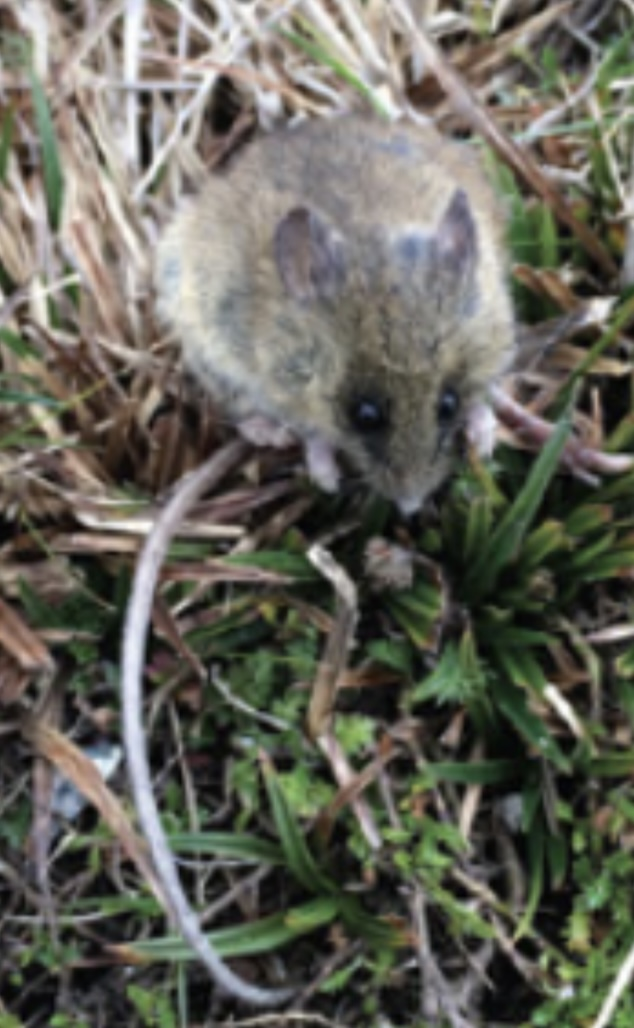

Conservation status
- Least Concern (IUCN 3.1)

Scientific classification
- Kingdom: Animalia
- Phylum: Chordata
- Class: Mammalia
- Infraclass: Placentalia
- Order: Rodentia
- Family: Cricetidae
- Subfamily: Sigmodontinae
- Genus: Microryzomys
- Species: M. altissimus

Binomial name
- Microryzomys altissimus (Osgood, 1933)

= Microryzomys altissimus =

Species of rodent

Microryzomys altissimus, also known as the Páramo colilargo or highland small rice rat, is a species of rodent in the genus Microryzomys of family Cricetidae. It is found in Colombia, Ecuador, and Peru, but the Colombian segment may be a separate species.

== Description ==
The Páramo colilargo has a greyish head, buffish upper parts and greyish-buff underparts and there is a clear demarcation between the dorsal and ventral colouring. The tail is dark above and pale below and is usually shorter than 110 mm (4.3 in). The feet have whitish hairs on the upper surface, and the metatarsal pads on the soles are narrow. Compared to the closely related Microryzomys minutus, the skull is wider and more robust, with longer incisive foramina and with longer rows of teeth. The diploid chromosomal count is 2n=57 and FN=58.

== Distribution and habitat ==
This rodent is native to South America where it occurs in the high Andes of Ecuador, Peru and Bolivia. Its altitudinal range is between 2,500 and 4,000 m (8,200 and 13,100 ft). Its range includes the Cordillera Central in Colombia where there is a separate population, and extends through the Cordillera Occidental and Cordillera Oriental of Ecuador, to the Andes of northern Peru, as far south as Junin. Its typical habitat is moist subalpine forest and páramo, a high altitude grassland.

== Status ==
The disjunct population in Colombia may be a separate species, and its conservation status would then need to be assessed separately, but the main population in Ecuador and Peru is large. M. altissimus may be threatened in places by deforestation and conversion of the páramo for agricultural use, but it is locally common, it has a wide range and occurs in several protected areas, so the International Union for Conservation of Nature has rated its conservation status as "least concern".
