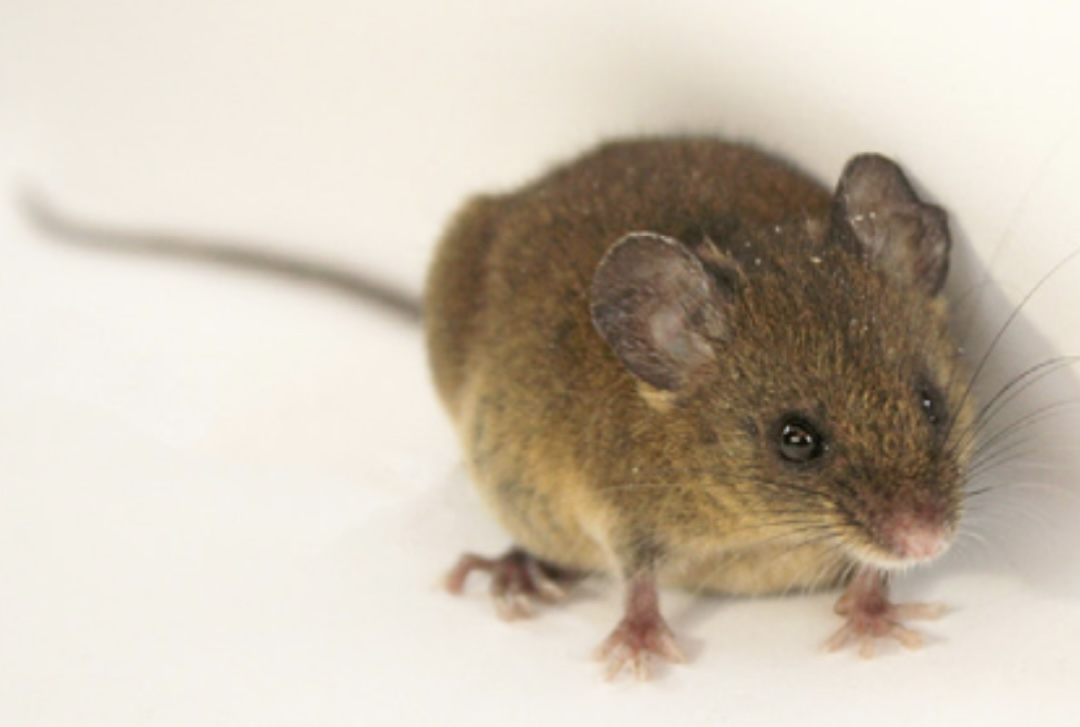
- Microryzomys minutus

Scientific classification
- Kingdom: Animalia
- Phylum: Chordata
- Class: Mammalia
- Infraclass: Placentalia
- Order: Rodentia
- Family: Cricetidae
- Subfamily: Sigmodontinae
- Tribe: Oryzomyini
- Genus: Microryzomys; Thomas, 1917

Type species
- Hesperomys minutus

Species
- Microryzomys altissimus; Microryzomys minutus

= Microryzomys =

Genus of rodents

Microryzomys is a genus of rodent in the tribe Oryzomyini of family Cricetidae. It is closely related to Oreoryzomys, Oligoryzomys, and Neacomys. It contains two species, both restricted to the Andes: M. altissimus and M. minutus.

== Characteristics ==
Microryzomys species are small members of the rodent tribe Oryzomyini, weighing in the region of 10 to 15 g (0.35 to 0.53 oz), and characterised by their long soft fur and tail longer than their head-and-body-length. They have small hind feet with six fleshy pads on the under surface, and with the fifth toe nearly as long as the middle three. The four pairs of mammae are arranged in the typical fashion for members of the tribe. At one time, this genus was considered to be a subgenus of Oryzomys, but Carleton and Musser (1989) raised it to full generic status on the basis of various anatomic details of skull and dentition and on certain morphological traits.

== Distribution ==
Microryzomys is found in high mountainous areas of western South America. The range of the genus extends from the Caribbean coastal ranges and the Cordillera de Mérida of Venezuela, through the Cordillera Occidental, Cordillera Central and Cordillera Oriental of Colombia, to the Andes ranges of Ecuador, Peru and Bolivia. This is also the range of M. minutus, because M. altissimus occurs only in the higher parts of this range and is limited to Colombia, Ecuador and Peru. M. minutus mostly occurs in moist forest habitats at altitudes between 1,500 and 3,500 m (4,900 and 11,500 ft), while M. altissimus inhabits moist subalpine forests and páramo grassland, at altitudes between 2,500 and 4,000 m (8,200 and 13,100 ft).

== Literature cited ==
- Weksler, M. 2006. Phylogenetic relationships of oryzomyine rodents (Muroidea: Sigmodontinae): separate and combined analyses of morphological and molecular data. Bulletin of the American Museum of Natural History 296:1–149.
