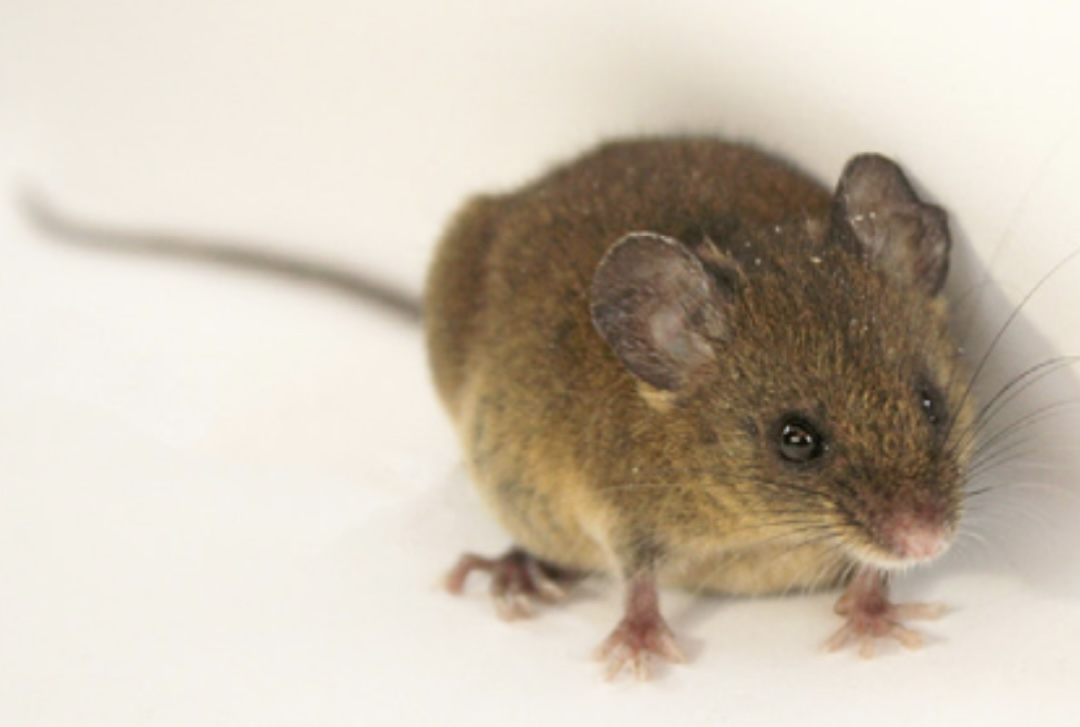

Conservation status
- Least Concern (IUCN 3.1)

Scientific classification
- Kingdom: Animalia
- Phylum: Chordata
- Class: Mammalia
- Order: Rodentia
- Family: Cricetidae
- Subfamily: Sigmodontinae
- Genus: Microryzomys
- Species: M. minutus

Binomial name
- Microryzomys minutus (Tomes, 1860)

= Microryzomys minutus =

Species of rodent

Microryzomys minutus, also known as the montane colilargo or the forest small rice rat, is a species of rodent in the genus Microryzomys of family Cricetidae. It is found in Bolivia, Colombia, Ecuador, Peru, and Venezuela, but these populations may represent more than one species.

== Description ==
The montane colilargo is an ochraceous-tawny colour with very little contrast between the dorsal and ventral surfaces. The tail is unicoloured and is at least 110 mm (4.3 in) long in the adult animal. The upper surfaces of the feet have dark markings, and the hind feet are relatively wide, with large metatarsal pads. The skull is narrower, shorter and less robust than that of the closely related Microryzomys altissimus, and all these characteristics help to distinguish between the two species. The karyotype is characterized as 2n=58.

== Distribution and habitat ==
The species is native to the South American Andes where it is mostly present at altitudes of between 2,000 and 3,500 m (6,600 and 11,500 ft), but exceptionally between 800 and 4,265 m (2,600 and 14,000 ft). Its range includes the Caribbean coastal ranges and the Cordillera de Mérida in Venezuela, the Cordillera Occidental, Cordillera Central and Cordillera Oriental in Colombia, and the high Andes of Ecuador, Peru and Bolivia. It inhabits a variety of moist forest habitats including both primary and secondary woodland, rainforests, pine forests, subalpine scrub and the fringes of the páramo. In Venezuela it is believed to be the commonest rodent in the cloud forests.

== Ecology ==
The omnivorous diet of M. minutus includes seeds, fruits, grass stems, insects and insect larvae. Although normally observed on the ground, the longer tail and larger pads on the soles may indicate that it is partially arboreal and it probably climbs more than does M. altissimus.
