= Western dwarf squirrel =

Conservation status
- Least Concern (IUCN 3.1)

Scientific classification
- Kingdom: Animalia
- Phylum: Chordata
- Class: Mammalia
- Order: Rodentia
- Family: Sciuridae
- Genus: Microsciurus
- Species: M. mimulus

Binomial name
- Microsciurus mimulus (Thomas, 1898)

Subspecies
- M. m. mimulus; M. m. boguetensis; M. m. isthmus
- Western dwarf squirrel range

Species of rodent

The western dwarf squirrel (Microsciurus mimulus) is a small tree squirrel in the genus Microsciurus and tribe Sciurini found in Colombia, Ecuador, and Panama.

All of the subspecies of M. mimulus have been recognized as distinct species in recent studies, although this is not yet universally accepted. The table below lists the three subspecies of Microsciurus mimulus, along with any synonyms associated with each subspecies:

Microsciurus mimulus taxonomy
Subspecies	Authority	Synonyms
M. m. mimulus	Thomas (1898)	none
M. m. boquetensis	Nelson (1903)	none
M. m. isthmius	Nelson (1899)	palmeri, vivatus
