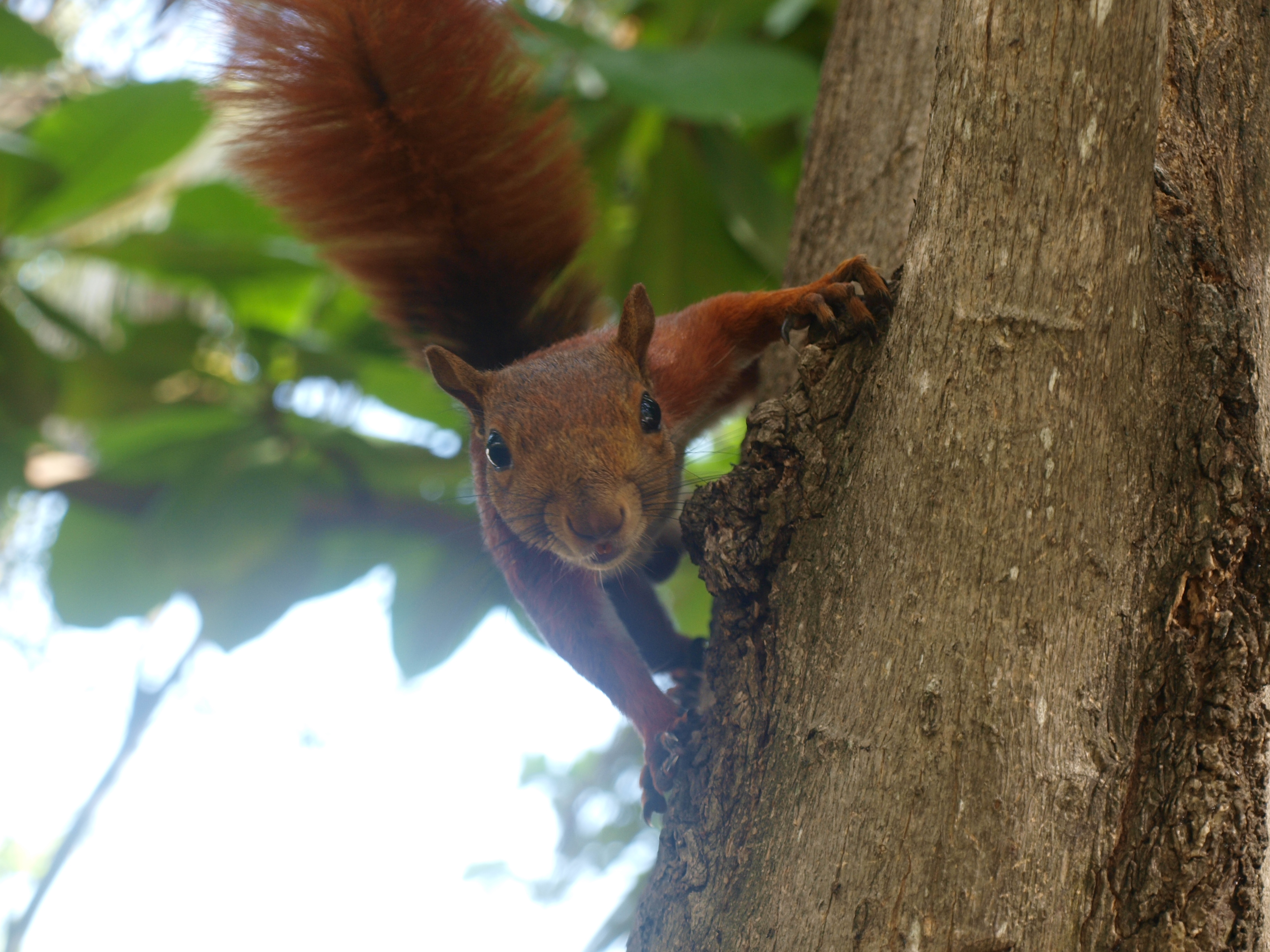

Conservation status
- Data Deficient (IUCN 3.1)

Scientific classification
- Kingdom: Animalia
- Phylum: Chordata
- Class: Mammalia
- Order: Rodentia
- Family: Sciuridae
- Genus: Sciurus
- Species: S. pucheranii

Binomial name
- Sciurus pucheranii (Fitzinger, 1867)

Subspecies
- S. p. pucheranii; S. p. caucensis; S. p. medellinensis
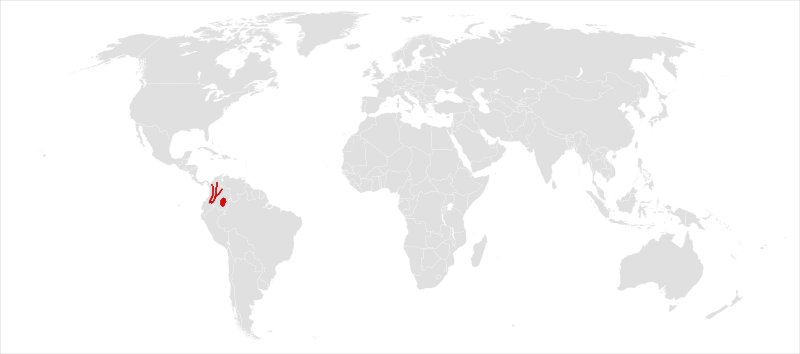
- Andean's squirrel's range

Synonyms
- Microsciurus pucherani

= Andean squirrel =

Species of rodent

The Andean squirrel (Sciurus pucheranii) is a tree squirrel endemic to Colombia where it inhabits montane rain forest and cloud forests of the Cordillera Occidental and Cordillera Central ranges of the Colombian Andes, at elevations between 2,000 and 3,300 metres (6,600 and 10,800 ft). It is a small species with a body length of about 14 cm (6 in) and a similar length tail. It has soft, silky, reddish-brown fur, a darker tail and yellowish-grey underparts. It is thought to be diurnal but has been little studied, and the International Union for Conservation of Nature has rated its conservation status as being data deficient.

== Description ==
The Andean squirrel is a typical tree squirrel, in its general proportions resembling the Eastern grey squirrel of North America. However, it is much smaller, with a body length of only about 14 centimetres (5.5 in), and a 12 to 16 centimetres (4.7 to 6.3 in) tail. Although there are few records of its weight, it appears to be generally between about 100 and 140 grams (3.5 and 4.9 oz). It has soft, silky, reddish-brown fur over most of the body, merging to greyish-yellow on the underparts. The tail fur is darker than that on the body, and some Andean squirrels also have a distinctive dark stripe down their flanks, and/or a black patch on the back of the head. Females have six teats.

== Distribution and habitat ==
It inhabits montane rain forest and cloud forests of the Cordillera Occidental and Cordillera Central of the Colombian Andes, at elevations between 2,000 and 3,300 metres (6,600 and 10,800 ft). As a tree squirrel, it lives among Cecropia trees, palms, and tree ferns. It is believed to be diurnal, but sufficiently little is known about its habits, population, and habitat requirements, that it is currently listed as data deficient by the IUCN.
