= List of mammals of Peru =

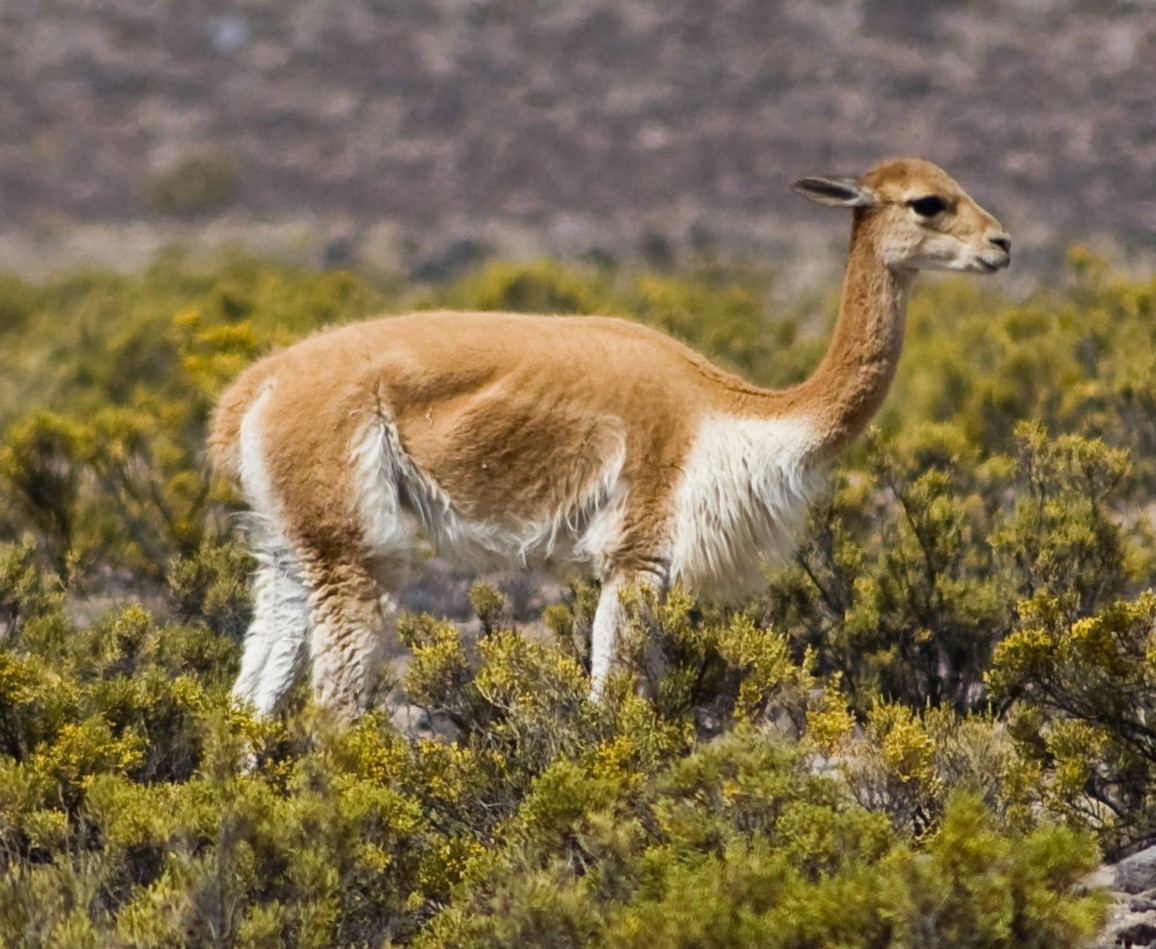
The vicuña, Lama vicugna, is the national animal of Peru

This is a list of the mammal species recorded in Peru. There are 417 mammal species in Peru, of which five are critically endangered, nine are endangered, thirty-two are vulnerable, and ten are near threatened.

The following tags are used to highlight each species' conservation status as assessed by the International Union for Conservation of Nature:

EX	Extinct	No reasonable doubt that the last individual has died.
EW	Extinct in the wild	Known only to survive in captivity or as a naturalized populations well outside its previous range.
CR	Critically endangered	The species is in imminent risk of extinction in the wild.
EN	Endangered	The species is facing an extremely high risk of extinction in the wild.
VU	Vulnerable	The species is facing a high risk of extinction in the wild.
NT	Near threatened	The species does not meet any of the criteria that would categorise it as risking extinction but it is likely to do so in the future.
LC	Least concern	There are no current identifiable risks to the species.
DD	Data deficient	There is inadequate information to make an assessment of the risks to this species.

Some species were assessed using an earlier set of criteria. Species assessed using this system have the following instead of near threatened and least concern categories:

LR/cd	Lower risk/conservation dependent	Species which were the focus of conservation programmes and may have moved into a higher risk category if that programme was discontinued.
LR/nt	Lower risk/near threatened	Species which are close to being classified as vulnerable but are not the subject of conservation programmes.
LR/lc	Lower risk/least concern	Species for which there are no identifiable risks.

== Subclass: Theria ==
=== Infraclass: Eutheria ===
==== Order: Sirenia (manatees and dugongs) ====
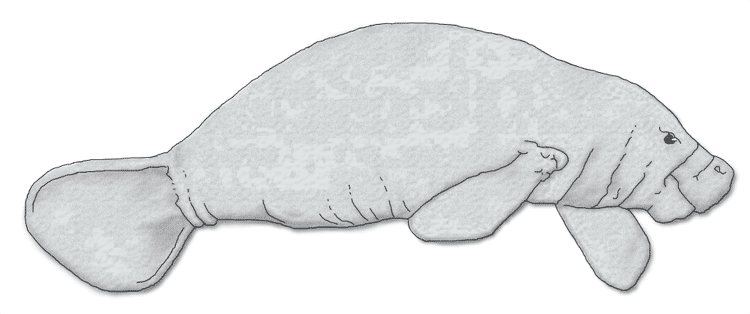
Amazonian manatee

Sirenia is an order of fully aquatic, herbivorous mammals that inhabit rivers, estuaries, coastal marine waters, swamps, and marine wetlands. All four species are endangered.

  - Family: Trichechidae
    - Genus: Trichechus
      - Amazonian manatee, Trichechus inunguis VU

==== Order: Cingulata (armadillos) ====
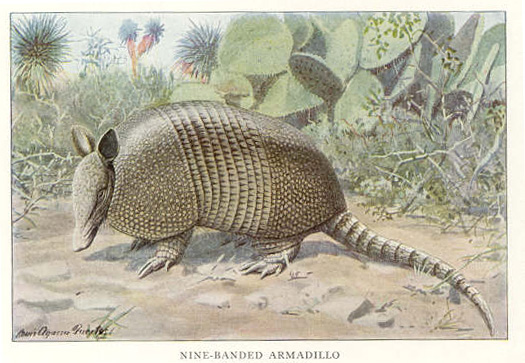
Nine-banded armadillo

The armadillos are small mammals with a bony armored shell. They are native to the Americas. There are around 20 extant species.

  - Family: Dasypodidae (armadillos)
    - Subfamily: Dasypodinae
      - Genus: Dasypus
        - Greater long-nosed armadillo, Dasypus kappleri LC
        - Nine-banded armadillo, Dasypus novemcinctus LC
        - Hairy long-nosed armadillo, Dasypus pilosus VU
    - Subfamily: Tolypeutinae
      - Genus: Cabassous
        - Southern naked-tailed armadillo, Cabassous unicinctus LC
      - Genus: Priodontes
        - Giant armadillo, Priodontes maximus VU

==== Order: Pilosa (anteaters, sloths and tamanduas) ====
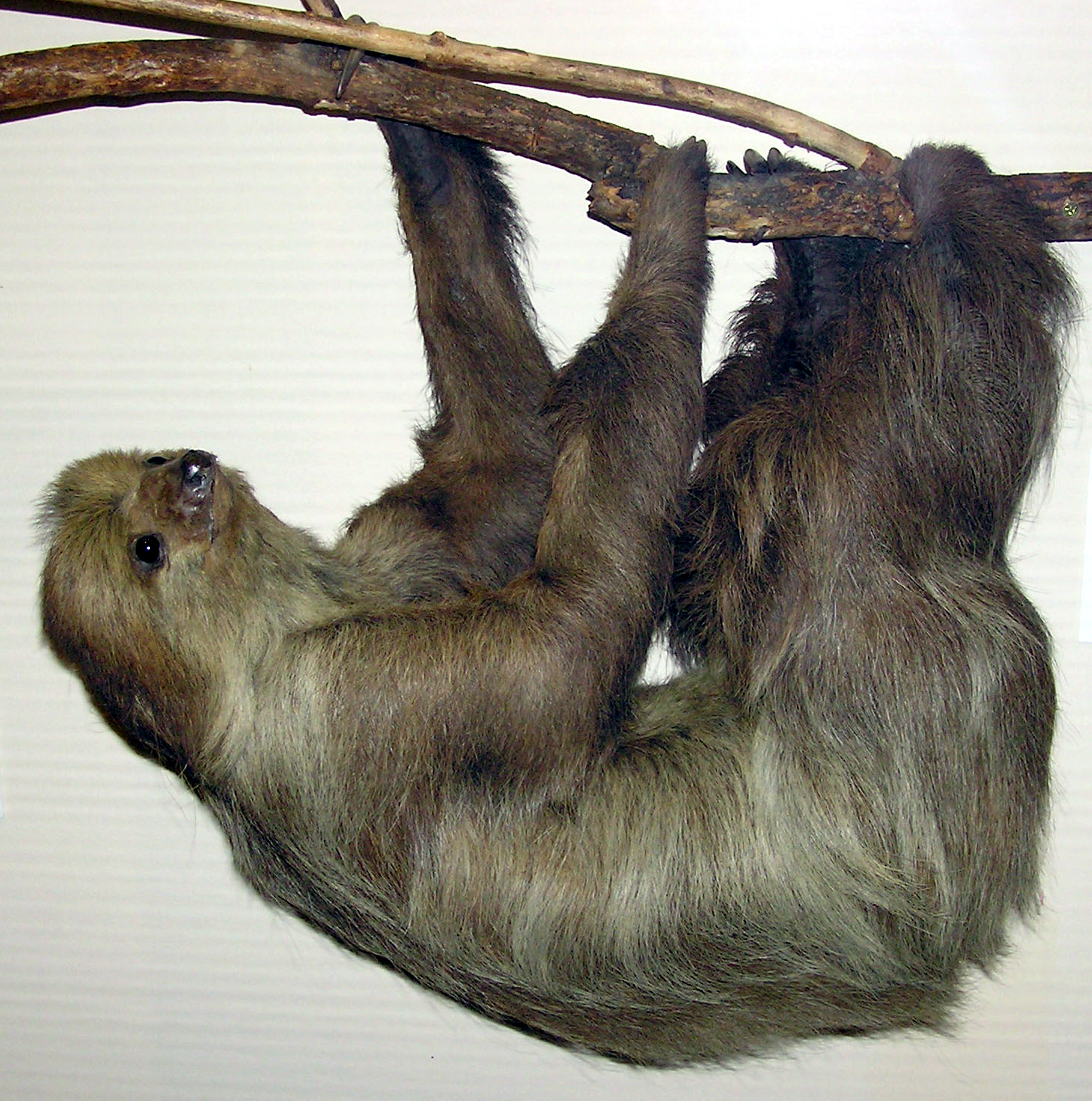
Linnaeus's two-toed sloth

The order Pilosa is extant only in the Americas and includes the anteaters, sloths, and tamanduas.

- Suborder: Folivora
  - Family: Bradypodidae (three-toed sloths)
    - Genus: Bradypus
      - Brown-throated three-toed sloth, Bradypus variegatus LC
  - Family: Choloepodidae (two-toed sloths)
    - Genus: Choloepus
      - Linnaeus's two-toed sloth, Choloepus didactylus LC
      - Hoffmann's two-toed sloth, Choloepus hoffmanni LC
- Suborder: Vermilingua
  - Family: Cyclopedidae
    - Genus: Cyclopes
      - Silky anteater, Cyclopes didactylus LC
  - Family: Myrmecophagidae (American anteaters)
    - Genus: Myrmecophaga
      - Giant anteater, Myrmecophaga tridactyla NT
    - Genus: Tamandua
      - Northern tamandua, Tamandua mexicana LC
      - Southern tamandua, Tamandua tetradactyla LC

==== Order: Primates ====
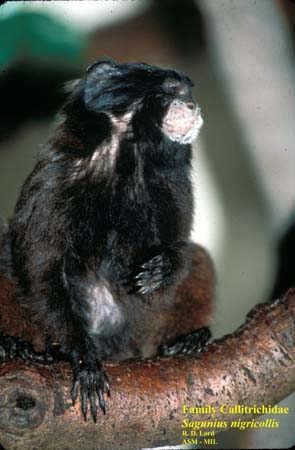
Black-mantled tamarin

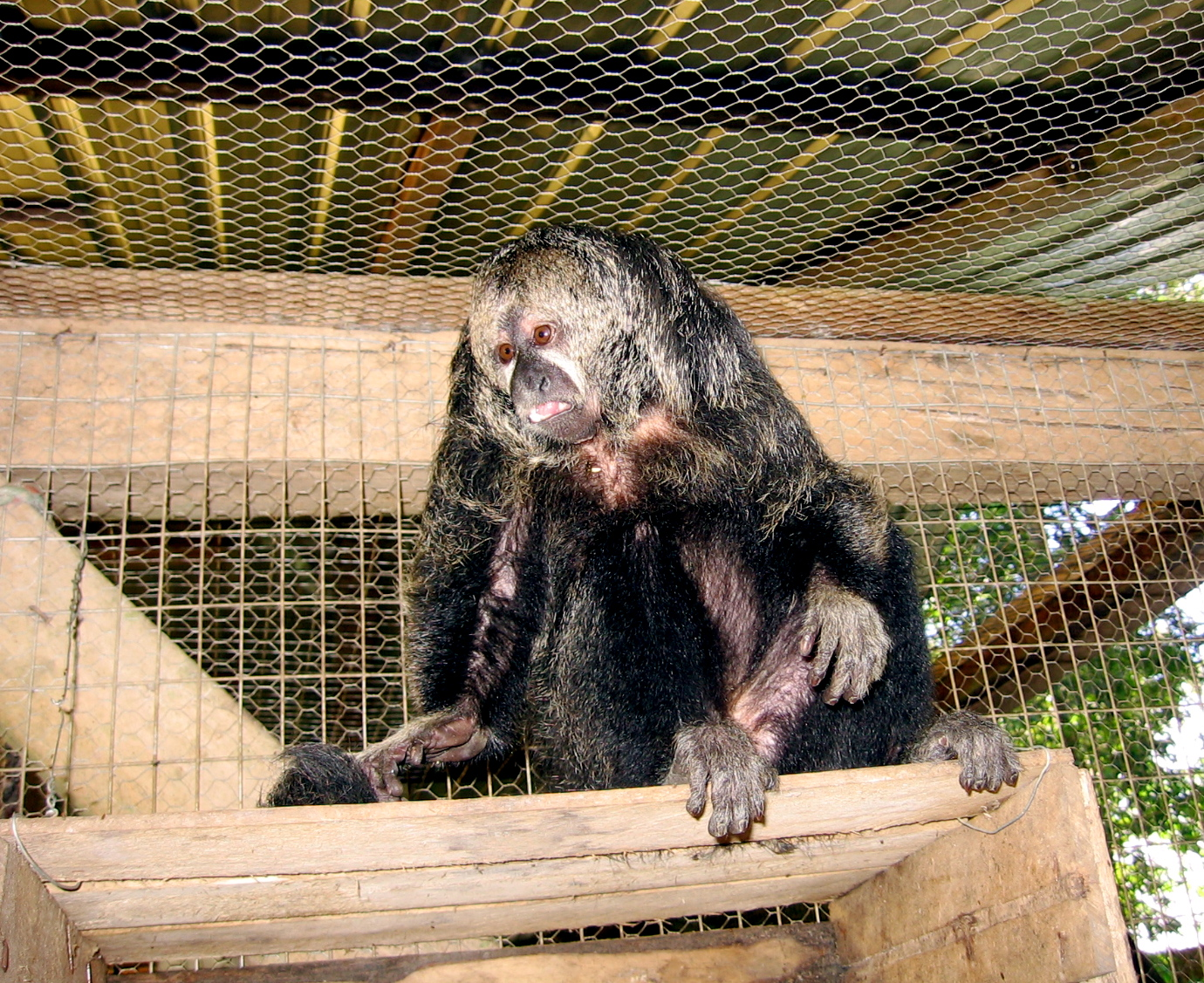
Monk saki

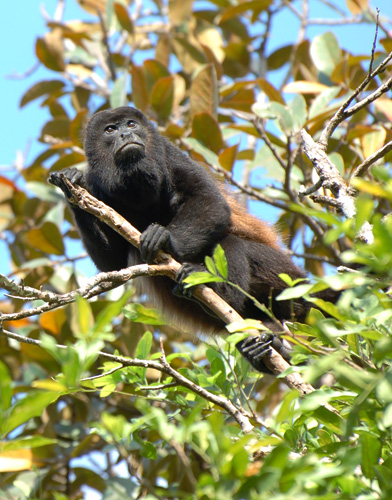
Mantled howler

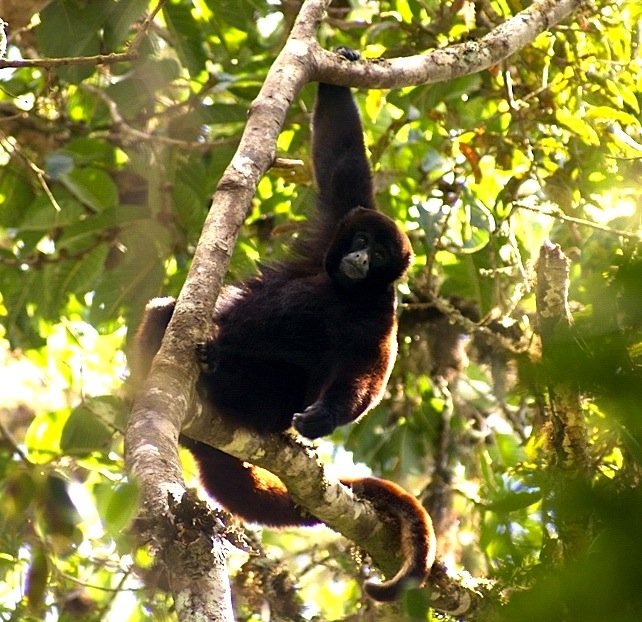
Yellow-tailed woolly monkey

The order Primates contains humans and their closest relatives: lemurs, lorisoids, monkeys, and apes.

- Suborder: Haplorhini
  - Infraorder: Simiiformes
    - Parvorder: Platyrrhini (New World monkeys)
      - Family: Cebidae
        - Subfamily: Callitrichinae
          - Genus: Callithrix
            - Pygmy marmoset, Cebuella pygmaea LC
          - Genus: Leontocebus
            - Brown-mantled tamarin, Leontocebus fuscicollis LC
            - Illiger's saddle-back tamarin, Leontocebus illigeri LC
            - Red-mantled saddle-back tamarin, Leontocebus lagonotus LC
            - Andean saddle-back tamarin, Leontocebus leucogenys LC
            - Black-mantled tamarin, Leonotcebus nigricollis LC
            - Geoffroy's saddle-back tamarin, Leontocebus nigrifrons LC
            - Golden-mantled tamarin, Leontocebus tripartitus LC
            - Weddell's saddle-back tamarin, Leontocebus weddelli LC
          - Genus: Saguinus
            - Emperor tamarin, Saguinus imperator LC
            - White-lipped tamarin, Saguinus labiatus LC
            - Moustached tamarin, Saguinus mystax LC
          - Genus: Callimico
            - Goeldi's marmoset, Callimico goeldii VU
        - Subfamily: Cebinae
          - Genus: Cebus
            - Humboldt's white-fronted capuchin, Cebus albifrons LC
            - Shock-headed capuchin, Cebus cuscinus NT
            - Spix's white-fronted capuchin, Cebus unicolor
            - Marañón white-fronted capuchin, Cebus yuracus
          - Genus: Sapajus
            - Large-headed capuchin, Sapajus macrocephalus LC
          - Genus: Saimiri
            - Black-capped squirrel monkey, Saimiri boliviensis LC
            - Humboldt's squirrel monkey, Saimiri cassiquiarensis
      - Family: Aotidae
        - Genus: Aotus
          - Peruvian night monkey, Aotus miconax VU
          - Nancy Ma's night monkey, Aotus nancymaae LC
          - Black-headed night monkey, Aotus nigriceps LC
          - Spix's night monkey, Aotus vociferans LC
      - Family: Pitheciidae
        - Subfamily: Callicebinae
          - Genus: Callicebus
            - Brown titi, Callicebus brunneus LC
            - Coppery titi, Callicebus cupreus LC
            - White-tailed titi, Callicebus discolor LC
            - Lucifer titi, Callicebus lucifer LC
            - Rio Mayo titi, Callicebus oenanthe VU
        - Subfamily: Pitheciinae
          - Genus: Pithecia
            - Equatorial saki, Pithecia aequatorialis LR/lc
            - Rio Tapajós saki, Pithecia irrorata LC
            - Monk saki, Pithecia monachus LC
          - Genus: Cacajao
            - Bald uakari, Cacajao calvus NT
      - Family: Atelidae
        - Subfamily: Alouattinae
          - Genus: Alouatta
            - Mantled howler, Alouatta palliata LC
            - Venezuelan red howler, Alouatta seniculus LC
        - Subfamily: Atelinae
          - Genus: Ateles
            - White-fronted spider monkey, Ateles belzebuth VU
            - Peruvian spider monkey, Ateles chamek LC
          - Genus: Lagothrix
            - Gray woolly monkey, Lagothrix cana NT
            - Yellow-tailed woolly monkey, Lagothrix flavicauda CR
            - Brown woolly monkey, Lagothrix lagothricha LR/lc
            - Silvery woolly monkey, Lagothrix poeppigii NT

==== Order: Rodentia (rodents) ====
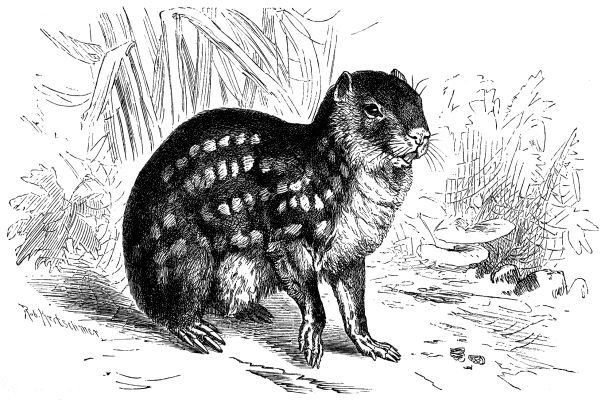
Lowland paca

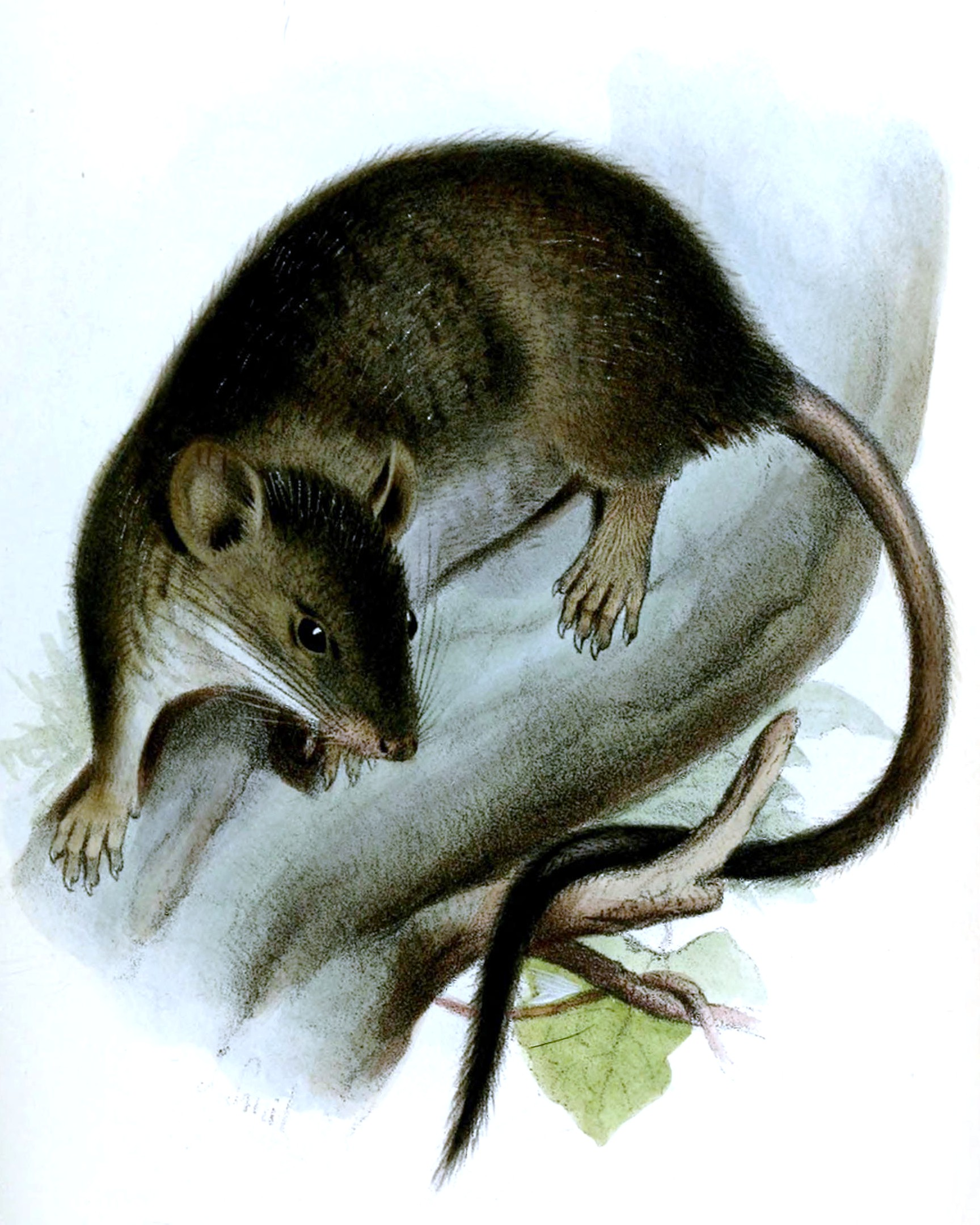
White-footed climbing mouse

Rodents make up the largest order of mammals, with over 40% of mammalian species. They have two incisors in the upper and lower jaw which grow continually and must be kept short by gnawing. Most rodents are small though the capybara can weigh up to 45 kg (99 lb).

- Suborder: Hystricognathi
  - Family: Erethizontidae (New World porcupines)
    - Subfamily: Erethizontinae
      - Genus: Coendou
        - Bicolor-spined porcupine, Coendou bicolor LR/lc
  - Family: Chinchillidae (viscachas and chinchillas)
    - Genus: Chinchilla
      - Short-tailed chinchilla, Chinchilla chinchilla EN extirpated
    - Genus: Lagidium
      - Northern viscacha, Lagidium peruanum LR/lc
      - Southern viscacha, Lagidium viscacia D
  - Family: Dinomyidae (pacarana)
    - Genus: Dinomys
      - Pacarana, Dinomys branickii VU
  - Family: Caviidae (guinea pigs)
    - Subfamily: Caviinae
      - Genus: Cavia
        - Guinea pig, Cavia porcellus LR/lc
        - Montane guinea pig, Cavia tschudii LR/lc
      - Genus: Galea
        - Common yellow-toothed cavy, Galea musteloides LR/lc
    - Subfamily: Hydrochoerinae (capybaras and rock cavies)
      - Genus: Hydrochoerus
        - Capybara, Hydrochoerus hydrochaeris LR/lc
  - Family: Dasyproctidae (agoutis and pacas)
    - Genus: Dasyprocta
      - Black agouti, Dasyprocta fuliginosa LR/lc
      - Kalinowski agouti, Dasyprocta kalinowskii DD
      - Central American agouti, Dasyprocta punctata LR/lc
    - Genus: Myoprocta
      - Red acouchi, Myoprocta acouchy LR/lc
      - Red acouchi, Myoprocta exilis DD
  - Family: Cuniculidae
    - Genus: Cuniculus
      - Lowland paca, Cuniculus paca LC
      - Mountain paca, Cuniculus taczanowskii NT
  - Family: Ctenomyidae
    - Genus: Ctenomys
      - White-toothed tuco-tuco, Ctenomys leucodon LR/lc
      - Highland tuco-tuco, Ctenomys opimus LR/lc
      - Peruvian tuco-tuco, Ctenomys peruanus LR/lc
  - Family: Abrocomidae
    - Genus: Abrocoma
      - Ashy chinchilla rat, Abrocoma cinerea LR/lc
  - Family: Echimyidae
    - Subfamily: Dactylomyinae
      - Genus: Dactylomys
        - Bolivian bamboo rat, Dactylomys boliviensis LR/lc
        - Amazon bamboo rat, Dactylomys dactylinus LR/lc
        - Montane bamboo rat, Dactylomys peruanus DD
    - Subfamily: Echimyinae
      - Genus: Echimys
        - Peruvian tree-rat, Echimys rhipidurus DD
        - Dark spiny tree-rat, Echimys saturnus LR/lc
      - Genus: Isothrix
        - Yellow-crowned brush-tailed rat, Isothrix bistriata LR/nt
      - Genus: Pattonomys
        - Bare-tailed armored tree-rat, Pattonomys occasius CR
    - Subfamily: Eumysopinae
      - Genus: Mesomys
        - Ferreira's spiny tree rat, Mesomys hispidus LR/lc
        - Woolly-headed spiny tree-rat, Mesomys leniceps LR/lc
      - Genus: Proechimys
        - Short-tailed spiny rat, Proechimys brevicauda LR/lc
        - Cuvier's spiny rat, Proechimys cuvieri LR/lc
        - Pacific spiny rat, Proechimys decumanus LR/lc
        - Long-tailed spiny rat, Proechimys longicaudatus LR/lc
        - Napo spiny rat, Proechimys quadruplicatus LR/lc
        - Simon's spiny rat, Proechimys simonsi LR/lc
        - Steere's spiny rat, Proechimys steerei LR/lc
- Suborder: Sciurognathi
  - Family: Sciuridae (squirrels)
    - Subfamily: Sciurillinae
      - Genus: Sciurillus
        - Neotropical pygmy squirrel, Sciurillus pusillus LR/lc
    - Subfamily: Sciurinae
      - Tribe: Sciurini
        - Genus: Microsciurus
          - Amazon dwarf squirrel, Microsciurus flaviventer LR/lc
        - Genus: Sciurus
          - Bolivian squirrel, Sciurus ignitus LR/lc
          - Northern Amazon red squirrel, Sciurus igniventris LR/lc
          - Junín red squirrel, Sciurus pyrrhinus LR/lc
          - Sanborn's squirrel, Sciurus sanborni LR/nt
          - Southern Amazon red squirrel, Sciurus spadiceus LR/lc
          - Guayaquil squirrel, Sciurus stramineus LR/lc
  - Family: Cricetidae
    - Subfamily: Sigmodontinae
      - Genus: Abrothrix
        - Andean altiplano mouse, Abrothrix andinus LR/lc
        - Jelski's altiplano mouse, Abrothrix jelskii LR/lc
      - Genus: Aegialomys
        - Yellowish oryzomys, Aegialomys xanthaeolus LR/lc
      - Genus: Akodon
        - Highland grass mouse, Akodon aerosus LR/lc
        - White-bellied grass mouse, Akodon albiventer LR/lc
        - Bolivian grass mouse, Akodon boliviensis LR/lc
        - Smoky grass mouse, Akodon fumeus LR/lc
        - Junin grass mouse, Akodon juninensis LR/lc
        - Koford's grass mouse, Akodon kofordi LR/lc
        - Thespian grass mouse, Akodon mimus LR/lc
        - Soft grass mouse, Akodon mollis LR/lc
        - El Dorado grass mouse, Akodon orophilus LR/lc
        - Altiplano grass mouse, Akodon puer LR/lc
        - Puno grass mouse, Akodon subfuscus LR/lc
        - Silent grass mouse, Akodon surdus LR/lc
        - Cloud forest grass mouse, Akodon torques LR/lc
      - Genus: Andinomys
        - Andean mouse, Andinomys edax LR/lc
      - Genus: Auliscomys
        - Bolivian big-eared mouse, Auliscomys boliviensis LR/lc
        - Painted big-eared mouse, Auliscomys pictus LR/lc
        - Andean big-eared mouse, Auliscomys sublimis LR/lc
      - Genus: Calomys
        - Andean vesper mouse, Calomys lepidus LR/lc
        - Peruvian vesper mouse, Calomys sorellus LR/lc
      - Genus: Chibchanomys
        - Chibchan water mouse, Chibchanomys trichotis LR/nt
      - Genus: Chinchillula
        - Altiplano chincilla mouse, Chinchillula sahamae LR/lc
      - Genus: Eligmodontia
        - Andean gerbil mouse, Eligmodontia puerulus LR/lc
      - Genus: Eremoryzomys
        - Gray rice rat, Eremoryzomys polius LR/lc
      - Genus: Euryoryzomys
        - MacConnell's rice rat, Euryoryzomys macconnelli LR/lc
        - Elegant rice rat, Euryoryzomys nitidus LR/lc
      - Genus: Galenomys
        - Garlepp's mouse, Galenomys garleppi LR/lc
      - Genus: Handleyomys
        - Black-eared rice rat, Handleyomys melanotis DD
      - Genus: Holochilus
        - Amazonian marsh rat, Holochilus sciureus LR/lc
      - Genus: Hylaeamys
        - Western Amazonian oryzomys, Hylaeamys perenensis LC
        - Yungas rice rat, Hylaeamys yunganus LR/lc
      - Genus: Ichthyomys
        - Stolzmann's crab-eating rat, Ichthyomys stolzmanni LR/lc
      - Genus: Lenoxus
        - Andean rat, Lenoxus apicalis LR/nt
      - Genus: Melanomys
        - Zuniga's dark rice rat, Melanomys zunigae LR/lc
      - Genus: Microryzomys
        - Highland small rice rat, Microryzomys altissimus LR/lc
        - Forest small rice rat, Microryzomys minutus LR/lc
      - Genus: Neacomys
        - Northern bristly mouse, Neacomys spinosus LR/lc
        - Narrow-footed bristly mouse, Neacomys tenuipes LR/lc
      - Genus: Necromys
        - Pleasant bolo mouse, Necromys amoenus LR/lc
      - Genus: Nectomys
        - Western Amazonian nectomys, Nectomys apicalis LC
        - Amazonian mouse, Nectomys rattus LC
      - Genus: Neotomys
        - Andean swamp rat, Neotomys ebriosus LR/lc
      - Genus: Nephelomys
        - Tomes's rice rat, Nephelomys albigularis LR/lc
        - Ecuadorian rice rat, Nephelomys auriventer LR/lc
        - Keays's rice rat, Nephelomys keaysi LR/lc
        - Light-footed rice rat, Nephelomys levipes LR/nt
      - Genus: Neusticomys
        - Peruvian fish-eating rat, Neusticomys peruviensis EN
      - Genus: Oecomys
        - Bicolored arboreal rice rat, Oecomys bicolor LR/lc
        - Dusky arboreal rice rat, Oecomys phaeotis LR/lc
        - Robert's arboreal rice rat, Oecomys roberti LR/lc
        - Trinidad arboreal rice rat, Oecomys trinitatis LR/lc
      - Genus: Oligoryzomys
        - Andean pygmy rice rat, Oligoryzomys andinus LR/lc
        - Sandy pygmy rice rat, Oligoryzomys arenalis LR/lc
        - Destructive pygmy rice rat, Oligoryzomys destructor DD
        - Small-eared pygmy rice rat, Oligoryzomys microtis LR/lc
      - Genus: Oreoryzomys
        - Peruvian rice rat, Oreoryzomys balneator LR/lc
      - Genus: Oxymycterus
        - Small hocicudo, Oxymycterus hiska VU
        - Incan hocicudo, Oxymycterus inca LR/lc
        - Paramo hocicudo, Oxymycterus paramensis LR/lc
      - Genus: Phyllotis
        - Friendly leaf-eared mouse, Phyllotis amicus LR/lc
        - Andean leaf-eared mouse, Phyllotis andium LR/lc
        - Darwin's leaf-eared mouse, Phyllotis darwini LR/lc
        - Definitive leaf-eared mouse, Phyllotis definitus LR/lc
        - Gerbil leaf-eared mouse, Phyllotis gerbillus LR/lc
        - Master leaf-eared mouse, Phyllotis magister LR/lc
        - Bunchgrass leaf-eared mouse, Phyllotis osilae LR/lc
      - Genus: Punomys
        - Puna mouse, Punomys lemminus LR/lc
      - Genus: Rhipidomys
        - Coues's climbing mouse, Rhipidomys couesi LR/lc
        - White-footed climbing mouse, Rhipidomys leucodactylus LR/lc
        - Atlantic Forest climbing mouse, Rhipidomys mastacalis LR/lc
        - Yellow-bellied climbing mouse, Rhipidomys ochrogaster LR/nt
      - Genus: Scolomys
        - Ucayali spiny mouse, Scolomys ucayalensis EN
      - Genus: Sigmodon
        - Peruvian cotton rat, Sigmodon peruanus LR/lc
      - Genus: Thomasomys
        - Golden Oldfield mouse, Thomasomys aureus LR/lc
        - Ash-colored Oldfield mouse, Thomasomys cinereus LR/lc
        - Daphne's Oldfield mouse, Thomasomys daphne LR/lc
        - Peruvian Oldfield mouse, Thomasomys eleusis LR/lc
        - Slender Oldfield mouse, Thomasomys gracilis LR/lc
        - Inca Oldfield mouse, Thomasomys incanus LR/lc
        - Strong-tailed Oldfield mouse, Thomasomys ischyurus LR/lc
        - Kalinowski's Oldfield mouse, Thomasomys kalinowskii LR/lc
        - Thomasomys lojapiuranus
        - Distinguished Oldfield mouse, Thomasomys notatus LR/nt
        - Thomasomys pagaibambensis
        - Thomas's Oldfield mouse, Thomasomys pyrrhonotus LR/lc
        - Rosalinda's Oldfield mouse, Thomasomys rosalinda LR/lc
        - Thomasomys shallqukucha
        - Taczanowski's Oldfield mouse, Thomasomys taczanowskii LR/lc

==== Order: Lagomorpha (lagomorphs) ====
The lagomorphs comprise two families, Leporidae (hares and rabbits), and Ochotonidae (pikas). Though they can resemble rodents, and were classified as a superfamily in that order until the early 20th century, they have since been considered a separate order. They differ from rodents in a number of physical characteristics, such as having four incisors in the upper jaw rather than two.

- Family: Leporidae (rabbits, hares)
  - Genus: Sylvilagus
    - Andean tapetí, Sylvilagus andinus DD
    - Common tapetí, Sylvilagus brasiliensis EN

==== Order: Chiroptera (bats) ====
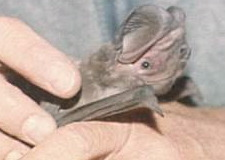
Western mastiff bat

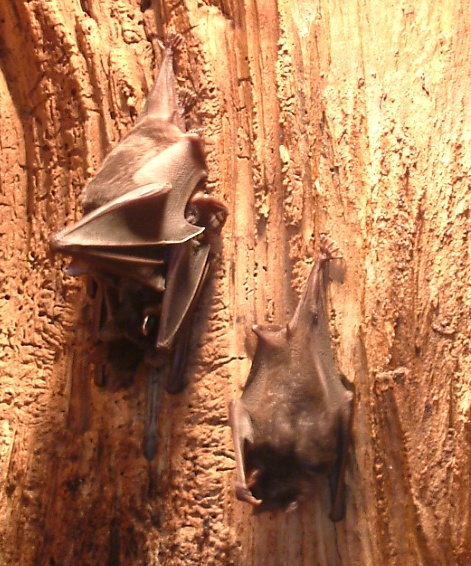
Pale spear-nosed bat

The bats' most distinguishing feature is that their forelimbs are developed as wings, making them the only mammals capable of flight. Bat species account for about 20% of all mammals.

- Family: Noctilionidae
  - Genus: Noctilio
    - Lesser bulldog bat, Noctilio albiventris LR/lc
    - Greater bulldog bat, Noctilio leporinus LR/lc
- Family: Vespertilionidae
  - Subfamily: Myotinae
    - Genus: Myotis
      - Silver-tipped myotis, Myotis albescens LR/lc
      - Atacama myotis, Myotis atacamensis VU
      - Hairy-legged myotis, Myotis keaysi LR/lc
      - Black myotis, Myotis nigricans LR/lc
      - Riparian myotis, Myotis riparius LR/lc
      - Velvety myotis, Myotis simus LR/lc
  - Subfamily: Vespertilioninae
    - Genus: Eptesicus
      - Little black serotine, Eptesicus andinus LR/lc
      - Brazilian brown bat, Eptesicus brasiliensis LR/lc
      - Argentine brown bat, Eptesicus furinalis LR/lc
      - Big brown bat, Eptesicus fuscus LR/lc
      - Harmless serotine, Eptesicus innoxius VU
    - Genus: Histiotus
      - Big-eared brown bat, Histiotus macrotus LR/nt
      - Small big-eared brown bat, Histiotus montanus LR/lc
    - Genus: Lasiurus
      - Desert red bat, Lasiurus blossevillii LR/lc
      - Hoary bat, Lasiurus cinereus LR/lc
  - Subfamily: Tomopeatinae
    - Genus: Tomopeas
      - Blunt-eared bat, Tomopeas ravus VU
- Family: Molossidae
  - Genus: Cynomops
    - Cinnamon dog-faced bat, Cynomops abrasus LR/nt
    - Southern dog-faced bat, Cynomops planirostris LR/lc
  - Genus: Eumops
    - Black bonneted bat, Eumops auripendulus LR/lc
    - Dwarf bonneted bat, Eumops bonariensis LR/lc
    - Wagner's bonneted bat, Eumops glaucinus LR/lc
    - Sanborn's bonneted bat, Eumops hansae LR/lc
    - Western mastiff bat, Eumops perotis LR/lc
  - Genus: Molossops
    - Rufous dog-faced bat, Molossops neglectus LR/nt
    - Dwarf dog-faced bat, Molossops temminckii LR/lc
  - Genus: Molossus
    - Black mastiff bat, Molossus ater LR/lc
    - Coiban mastiff bat, Molossus coibensis LR/nt
    - Velvety free-tailed bat, Molossus molossus LR/lc
  - Genus: Mormopterus
    - Kalinowski's mastiff bat, Mormopterus kalinowskii VU
    - Incan little mastiff bat, Mormopterus phrudus EN
  - Genus: Nyctinomops
    - Peale's free-tailed bat, Nyctinomops aurispinosus LR/lc
    - Broad-eared bat, Nyctinomops laticaudatus LR/lc
    - Big free-tailed bat, Nyctinomops macrotis LR/lc
  - Genus: Promops
    - Big crested mastiff bat, Promops centralis LR/lc
    - Brown mastiff bat, Promops nasutus LR/lc
  - Genus: Tadarida
    - Mexican free-tailed bat, Tadarida brasiliensis LR/nt
- Family: Emballonuridae
  - Genus: Centronycteris
    - Shaggy bat, Centronycteris maximiliani LR/lc
  - Genus: Cormura
    - Wagner's sac-winged bat, Cormura brevirostris LR/lc
  - Genus: Diclidurus
    - Northern ghost bat, Diclidurus albus LR/lc
    - Greater ghost bat, Diclidurus ingens VU
    - Lesser ghost bat, Diclidurus scutatus LR/lc
  - Genus: Peropteryx
    - Greater dog-like bat, Peropteryx kappleri LR/lc
    - White-winged dog-like bat, Peropteryx leucoptera LR/lc
    - Lesser dog-like bat, Peropteryx macrotis LR/lc
  - Genus: Rhynchonycteris
    - Proboscis bat, Rhynchonycteris naso LR/lc
  - Genus: Saccopteryx
    - Greater sac-winged bat, Saccopteryx bilineata LR/lc
    - Frosted sac-winged bat, Saccopteryx canescens LR/lc
    - Lesser sac-winged bat, Saccopteryx leptura LR/lc
- Family: Mormoopidae
  - Genus: Mormoops
    - Ghost-faced bat, Mormoops megalophylla LR/lc
  - Genus: Pteronotus
    - Naked-backed bat, Pteronotus davyi LR/lc
    - Big naked-backed bat, Pteronotus gymnonotus LR/lc
    - Parnell's mustached bat, Pteronotus parnellii LR/lc
    - Wagner's mustached bat, Pteronotus personatus LR/lc
- Family: Phyllostomidae
  - Subfamily: Phyllostominae
    - Genus: Glyphonycteris
      - Behni's big-eared bat, Glyphonycteris behnii VU
      - Davies's big-eared bat, Glyphonycteris daviesi LR/nt
      - Tricolored big-eared bat, Glyphonycteris sylvestris LR/nt
    - Genus: Lonchorhina
      - Tomes's sword-nosed bat, Lonchorhina aurita LR/lc
    - Genus: Lophostoma
      - Pygmy round-eared bat, Lophostoma brasiliense LR/lc
      - Carriker's round-eared bat, Lophostoma carrikeri VU
      - White-throated round-eared bat, Lophostoma silvicolum LR/lc
    - Genus: Macrophyllum
      - Long-legged bat, Macrophyllum macrophyllum LR/lc
    - Genus: Micronycteris
      - Brosset's big-eared bat, Micronycteris brosseti DD
      - Hairy big-eared bat, Micronycteris hirsuta LR/lc
      - Little big-eared bat, Micronycteris megalotis LR/lc
      - White-bellied big-eared bat, Micronycteris minuta LR/lc
    - Genus: Mimon
      - Striped hairy-nosed bat, Mimon crenulatum LR/lc
    - Genus: Phylloderma
      - Pale-faced bat, Phylloderma stenops LR/lc
    - Genus: Phyllostomus
      - Pale spear-nosed bat, Phyllostomus discolor LR/lc
      - Lesser spear-nosed bat, Phyllostomus elongatus LR/lc
      - Greater spear-nosed bat, Phyllostomus hastatus LR/lc
    - Genus: Tonatia
      - Greater round-eared bat, Tonatia bidens LR/lc
      - Stripe-headed round-eared bat, Tonatia saurophila LR/lc
    - Genus: Trachops
      - Fringe-lipped bat, Trachops cirrhosus LR/lc
    - Genus: Trinycteris
      - Niceforo's big-eared bat, Trinycteris nicefori LR/lc
    - Genus: Vampyrum
      - Spectral bat, Vampyrum spectrum LR/nt
  - Subfamily: Lonchophyllinae
    - Genus: Lionycteris
      - Chestnut long-tongued bat, Lionycteris spurrelli LR/lc
    - Genus: Lonchophylla
      - Handley's nectar bat, Lonchophylla handleyi VU
      - Western nectar bat, Lonchophylla hesperia VU
      - Orange nectar bat, Lonchophylla robusta LR/lc
      - Thomas's nectar bat, Lonchophylla thomasi LR/lc
    - Genus: Platalina
      - Long-snouted bat, Platalina genovensium VU
  - Subfamily: Glossophaginae
    - Genus: Anoura
      - Tailed tailless bat, Anoura caudifer LR/lc
      - Handley's tailless bat, Anoura cultrata LR/lc
      - Geoffroy's tailless bat, Anoura geoffroyi LR/lc
      - Broad-toothed tailless bat, Anoura latidens LR/nt
    - Genus: Choeroniscus
      - Intermediate long-tailed bat, Choeroniscus intermedius LR/nt
      - Minor long-nosed long-tongued bat, Choeroniscus minor LR/lc
    - Genus: Glossophaga
      - Commissaris's long-tongued bat, Glossophaga commissarisi LR/lc
      - Pallas's long-tongued bat, Glossophaga soricina LR/lc
    - Genus: Lichonycteris
      - Dark long-tongued bat, Lichonycteris obscura LR/lc
  - Subfamily: Carolliinae
    - Genus: Carollia
      - Chestnut short-tailed bat, Carollia castanea LR/lc
      - Seba's short-tailed bat, Carollia perspicillata LR/lc
    - Genus: Rhinophylla
      - Fischer's little fruit bat, Rhinophylla fischerae LR/nt
      - Dwarf little fruit bat, Rhinophylla pumilio LR/lc
  - Subfamily: Stenodermatinae
    - Genus: Artibeus
      - Andersen's fruit-eating bat, Artibeus anderseni LR/lc
      - Brown fruit-eating bat, Artibeus concolor LR/nt
      - Fraternal fruit-eating bat, Artibeus fraterculus VU
      - Silver fruit-eating bat, Artibeus glaucus LR/lc
      - Jamaican fruit bat, Artibeus jamaicensis LR/lc
      - Great fruit-eating bat, Artibeus lituratus LR/lc
      - Dark fruit-eating bat, Artibeus obscurus LR/nt
      - Pygmy fruit-eating bat, Artibeus phaeotis LR/lc
    - Genus: Chiroderma
      - Salvin's big-eyed bat, Chiroderma salvini LR/lc
      - Little big-eyed bat, Chiroderma trinitatum LR/lc
      - Hairy big-eyed bat, Chiroderma villosum LR/lc
    - Genus: Enchisthenes
      - Velvety fruit-eating bat, Enchisthenes hartii LR/lc
    - Genus: Mesophylla
      - MacConnell's bat, Mesophylla macconnelli LR/lc
    - Genus: Sphaeronycteris
      - Visored bat, Sphaeronycteris toxophyllum LR/lc
    - Genus: Sturnira
      - Aratathomas's yellow-shouldered bat, Sturnira aratathomasi LR/nt
      - Bidentate yellow-shouldered bat, Sturnira bidens LR/nt
      - Bogota yellow-shouldered bat, Sturnira bogotensis LR/lc
      - Hairy yellow-shouldered bat, Sturnira erythromos LR/lc
      - Little yellow-shouldered bat, Sturnira lilium LR/lc
      - Louis's yellow-shouldered bat, Sturnira luisi LR/lc
      - Greater yellow-shouldered bat, Sturnira magna LR/nt
      - Lesser yellow-shouldered bat, Sturnira nana VU
      - Tilda's yellow-shouldered bat, Sturnira tildae LR/lc
    - Genus: Uroderma
      - Tent-making bat, Uroderma bilobatum LR/lc
      - Brown tent-making bat, Uroderma magnirostrum LR/lc
    - Genus: Vampyressa
      - Bidentate yellow-eared bat, Vampyressa bidens LR/nt
      - Brock's yellow-eared bat, Vampyressa brocki LR/nt
      - Melissa's yellow-eared bat, Vampyressa melissa LR/nt
      - Southern little yellow-eared bat, Vampyressa pusilla LR/lc
    - Genus: Vampyrodes
      - Great stripe-faced bat, Vampyrodes caraccioli LR/lc
    - Genus: Platyrrhinus
      - Short-headed broad-nosed bat, Platyrrhinus brachycephalus LR/lc
      - Thomas's broad-nosed bat, Platyrrhinus dorsalis LR/lc
      - Heller's broad-nosed bat, Platyrrhinus helleri LR/lc
      - Buffy broad-nosed bat, Platyrrhinus infuscus LR/nt
      - White-lined broad-nosed bat, Platyrrhinus lineatus LR/lc
      - Greater broad-nosed bat, Platyrrhinus vittatus LR/lc
  - Subfamily: Desmodontinae
    - Genus: Desmodus
      - Common vampire bat, Desmodus rotundus LR/lc
    - Genus: Diaemus
      - White-winged vampire bat, Diaemus youngi LR/lc
    - Genus: Diphylla
      - Hairy-legged vampire bat, Diphylla ecaudata LR/nt
- Family: Furipteridae
  - Genus: Amorphochilus
    - Smokey bat, Amorphochilus schnablii VU
  - Genus: Furipterus
    - Thumbless bat, Furipterus horrens LR/lc
- Family: Thyropteridae
  - Genus: Thyroptera
    - Peters's disk-winged bat, Thyroptera discifera LR/lc
    - LaVal's disk-winged bat, Thyroptera lavali DD
    - Spix's disk-winged bat, Thyroptera tricolor LR/lc

==== Order: Cetacea (whales) ====
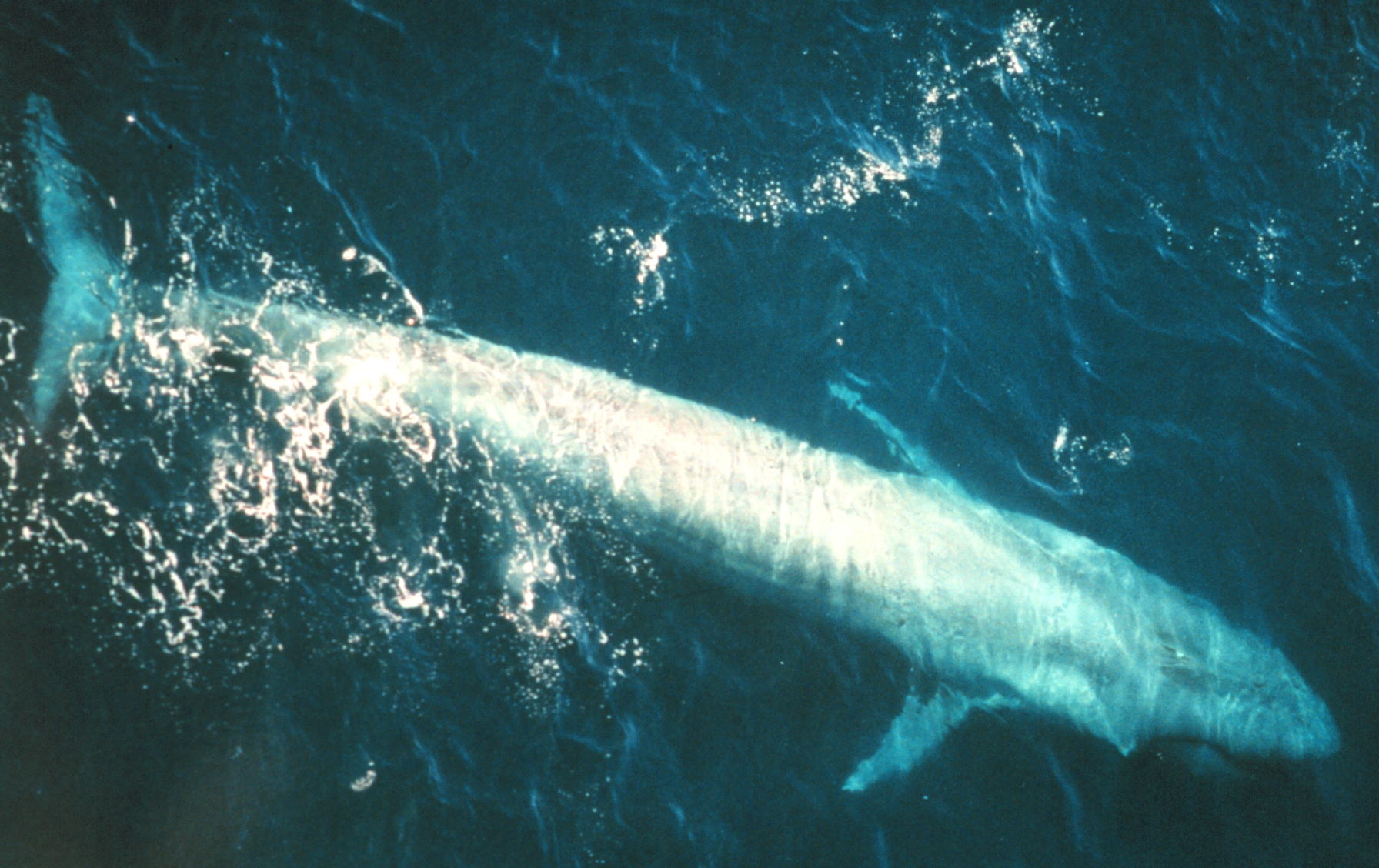
Blue whale

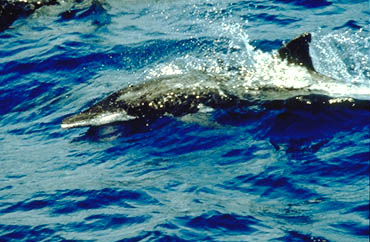
Rough-toothed dolphin

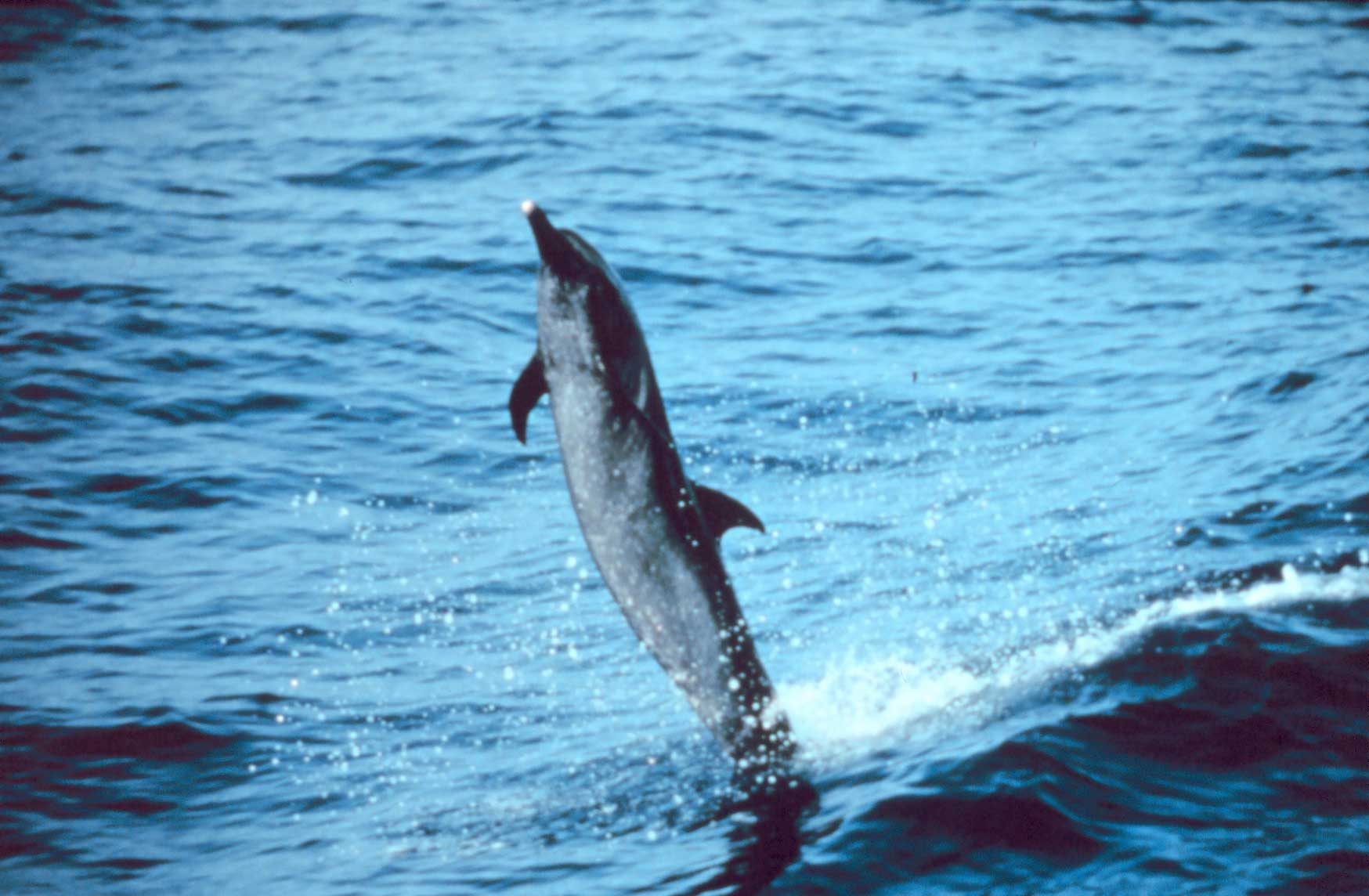
Pantropical spotted dolphin

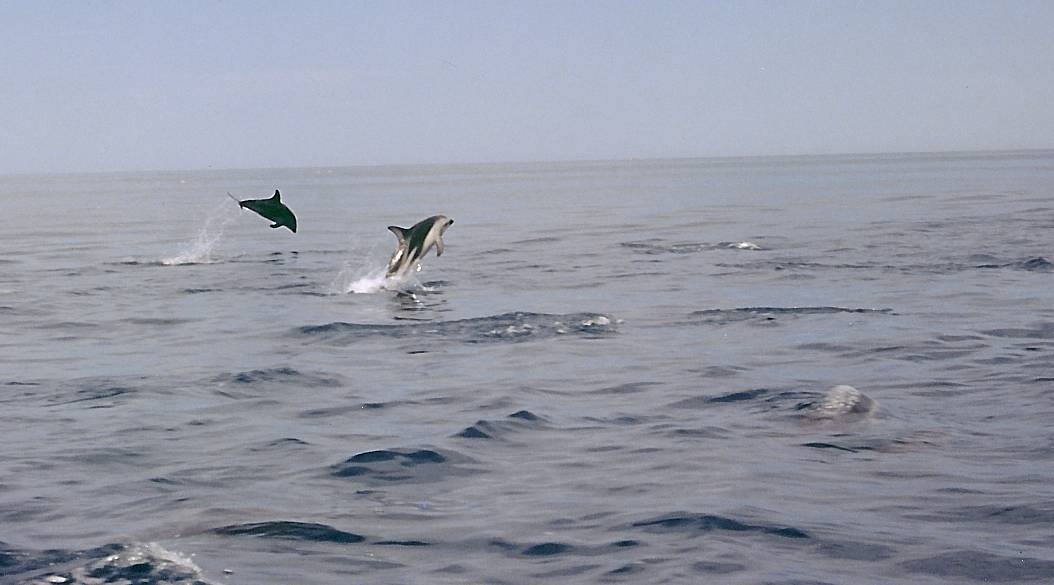
Dusky dolphin

The order Cetacea includes whales, dolphins and porpoises. They are the mammals most fully adapted to aquatic life with a spindle-shaped nearly hairless body, protected by a thick layer of blubber, and forelimbs and tail modified to provide propulsion underwater. Most live in the ocean, but there are fresh water dolphins in the Amazon basin.

- Suborder: Mysticeti
  - Family: Balaenopteridae
  - Family: Balaenidae
    - Genus: Eubalaena
      - Southern right whale, Eubalaena australis LR/cd
    - Subfamily: Balaenopterinae
      - Genus: Balaenoptera
        - Common minke whale, Balaenoptera acutorostrata LR/nt
        - Antarctic minke whale, Balaenoptera bonaerensis DD
        - Bryde's whale, Balaenoptera edeni DD
        - Sei whale, Balaenoptera borealis EN
        - Fin whale, Balaenoptera physalus EN
        - Blue whale, Balaenoptera musculus EN
    - Subfamily: Megapterinae
      - Genus: Megaptera
        - Humpback whale, Megaptera novaeangliae VU
- Suborder: Odontoceti
  - Superfamily: Platanistoidea
    - Family: Iniidae
      - Genus: Inia
        - Amazon river dolphin, Inia geoffrensis DD
    - Family: Phocoenidae
      - Genus: Phocoena
        - Burmeister's porpoise, Phocoena spinipinnis DD
    - Family: Physeteridae
      - Genus: Physeter
        - Sperm whale, Physeter macrocephalus VU
    - Family: Kogiidae
      - Genus: Kogia
        - Pygmy sperm whale, Kogia breviceps LR/lc
        - Dwarf sperm whale, Kogia sima LR/lc
    - Family: Ziphidae
      - Subfamily: Ziphiinae
        - Genus: Ziphius
          - Cuvier's beaked whale, Ziphius cavirostris DD
      - Subfamily: Hyperoodontinae
        - Genus: Mesoplodon
          - Blainville's beaked whale, Mesoplodon densirostris DD
          - Ginkgo-toothed beaked whale, Mesoplodon ginkgodens DD
          - Gray's beaked whale, Mesoplodon grayi DD
          - Pygmy beaked whale, Mesoplodon peruvianus DD
    - Family: Delphinidae (marine dolphins)
      - Genus: Steno
        - Rough-toothed dolphin, Steno bredanensis DD
      - Genus: Sotalia
        - Tucuxi, Sotalia fluviatilis DD
      - Genus: Stenella
        - Pantropical spotted dolphin, Stenella attenuata LR/cd
        - Spinner dolphin, Stenella longirostris LR/cd
      - Genus: Delphinus
        - Long-beaked common dolphin, Delphinus capensis DD
        - Short-beaked common dolphin, Delphinus delphis LC
      - Genus: Tursiops
        - Common bottlenose dolphin, Tursiops truncatus LC
      - Genus: Lagenodelphis
        - Fraser's dolphin, Lagenodelphis hosei DD
      - Genus: Lissodelphis
        - Southern right whale dolphin, Lissodelphis peronii DD
      - Genus: Sagmatias
        - Dusky dolphin, Sagmatias obscurus DD
      - Genus: Feresa
        - Pygmy killer whale, Feresa attenuata DD
      - Genus: Grampus
        - Risso's dolphin, Grampus griseus DD
      - Genus: Peponocephala
        - Melon-headed whale, Peponocephala electra DD
      - Genus: Pseudorca
        - False killer whale, Pseudorca crassidens LR/lc
      - Genus: Orcinus
        - Orca, Orcinus orca LR/cd
      - Genus: Globicephala
        - Short-finned pilot whale, Globicephala macrorhynchus DD
        - Long-finned pilot whale, Globicephala melas DD

==== Order: Carnivora (carnivorans) ====
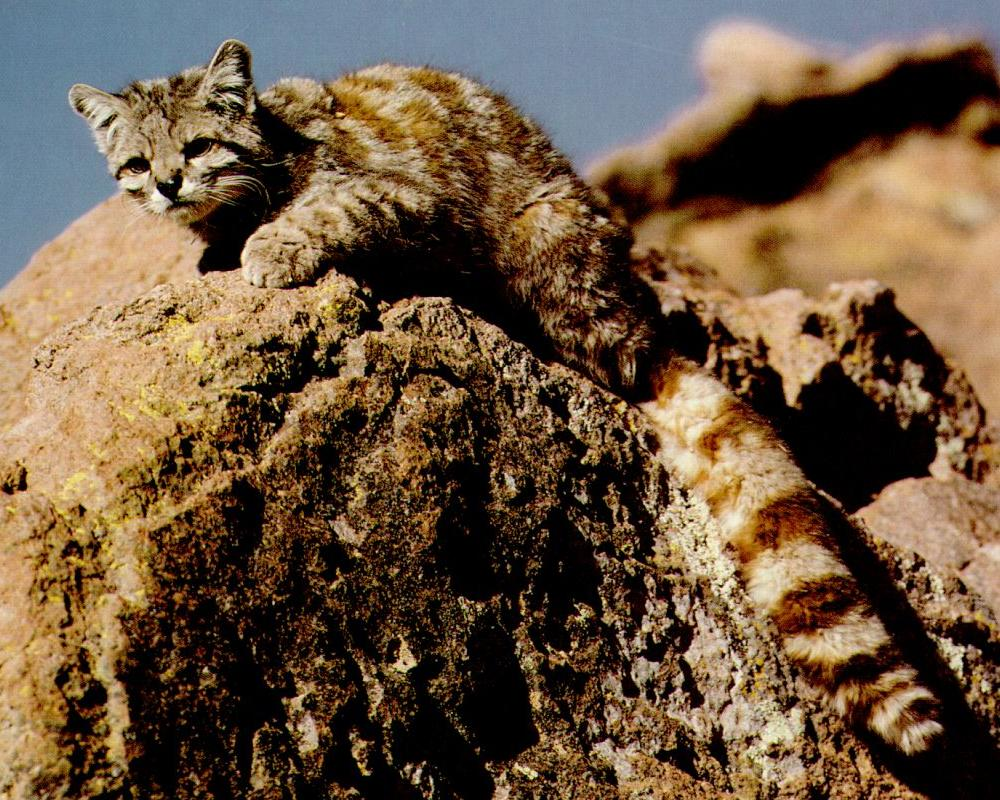
Andean mountain cat

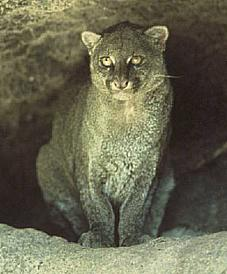
Jaguarundi

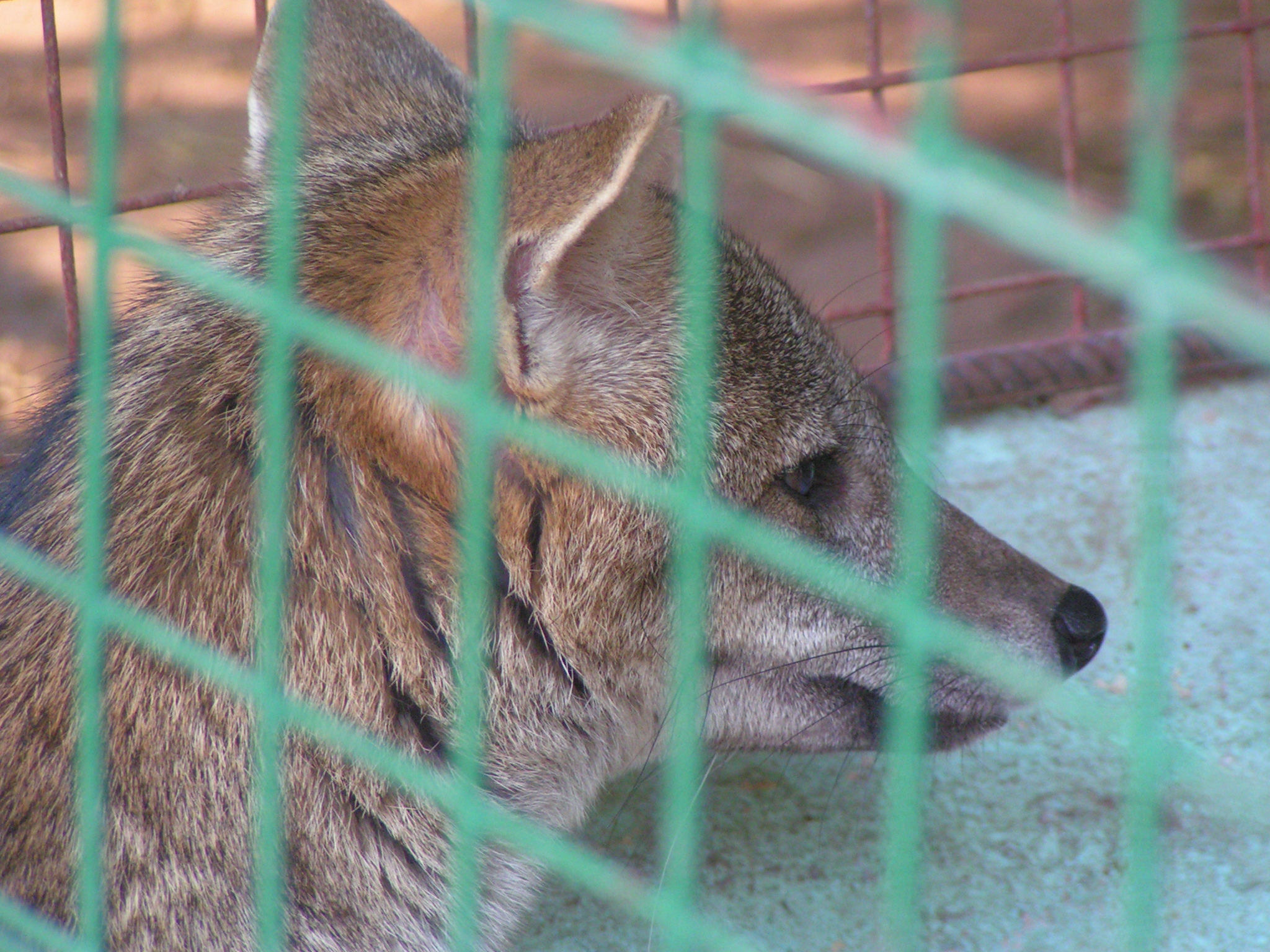
Argentine grey fox

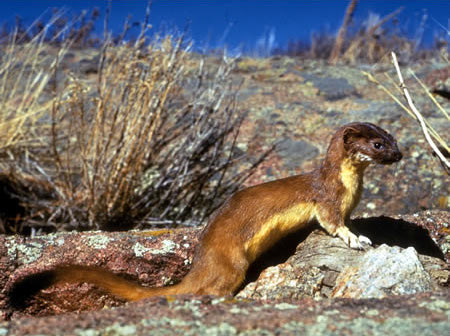
Long-tailed weasel

There are over 260 species of carnivorans, the majority of which feed primarily on meat. They have a characteristic skull shape and dentition.

- Suborder: Feliformia
  - Family: Felidae (cats)
    - Subfamily: Felinae
      - Genus: Leopardus
        - Pampas cat L. colocola NT
        - Andean mountain cat L. jacobitusEN
        - Ocelot L. pardalis LC
        - Oncilla L. tigrinus VU
        - Margay L. wiedii NT
      - Genus: Puma
        - Cougar, P. concolor LC
      - Genus: Herpailurus
        - Jaguarundi, H. yagouaroundi LC
    - Subfamily: Pantherinae
      - Genus: Panthera
        - Jaguar, P. onca NT
- Suborder: Caniformia
  - Family: Canidae (dogs, foxes)
    - Genus: Lycalopex
      - Culpeo, Lycalopex culpaeus LC
      - South American gray fox, Lycalopex griseus LC
      - Sechura fox, Lycalopex sechurae DD
    - Genus: Atelocynus
      - Short-eared dog, Atelocynus microtis DD
    - Genus: Speothos
      - Bush dog, Speothos venaticus VU
    - Genus: Chrysocyon
      - Maned wolf, Chrysocyon brachyurus NT
  - Family: Ursidae (bears)
    - Genus: Tremarctos
      - Spectacled bear, Tremarctos ornatus VU
  - Family: Procyonidae (raccoons)
    - Genus: Procyon
      - Crab-eating raccoon, Procyon cancrivorus
    - Genus: Nasua
      - South American coati, Nasua nasua
    - Genus: Potos
      - Kinkajou, Potos flavus
    - Genus: Bassaricyon
      - Eastern lowland olingo, Bassaricyon alleni
  - Family: Mustelidae (mustelids)
    - Genus: Eira
      - Tayra, Eira barbara
    - Genus: Galictis
      - Lesser grison, Galictis cuja
      - Greater grison, Galictis vittata
    - Genus: Lontra
      - Marine otter, Lontra felina EN
      - Neotropical river otter, Lontra longicaudis DD
    - Genus: Neogale
      - Amazon weasel, Neogale africana DD
      - Long-tailed weasel, Neogale frenata
    - Genus: Pteronura
      - Giant otter, Pteronura brasiliensis EN
  - Family: Otariidae (eared seals, sealions)
    - Genus: Arctocephalus
      - South American fur seal, Arctocephalus australis
    - Genus: Otaria
      - South American sea lion, Otaria flavescens
  - Family: Mephitidae
    - Genus: Conepatus
      - Molina's hog-nosed skunk, Conepatus chinga
      - Striped hog-nosed skunk, Conepatus semistriatus

==== Order: Perissodactyla (odd-toed ungulates) ====
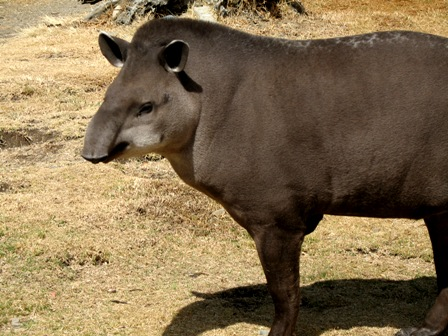
Brazilian tapir

The odd-toed ungulates are browsing and grazing mammals. They are usually large to very large, and have relatively simple stomachs and a large middle toe.

- Family: Tapiridae (tapirs)
  - Genus: Tapirus
    - Mountain tapir, Tapirus pinchaque EN
    - Brazilian tapir, Tapirus terrestris VU

==== Order: Artiodactyla (even-toed ungulates) ====
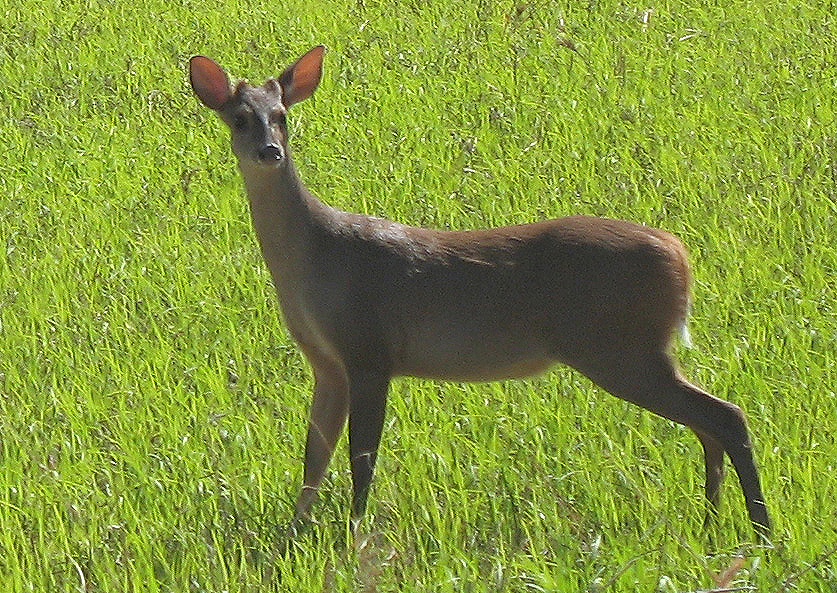
Red brocket

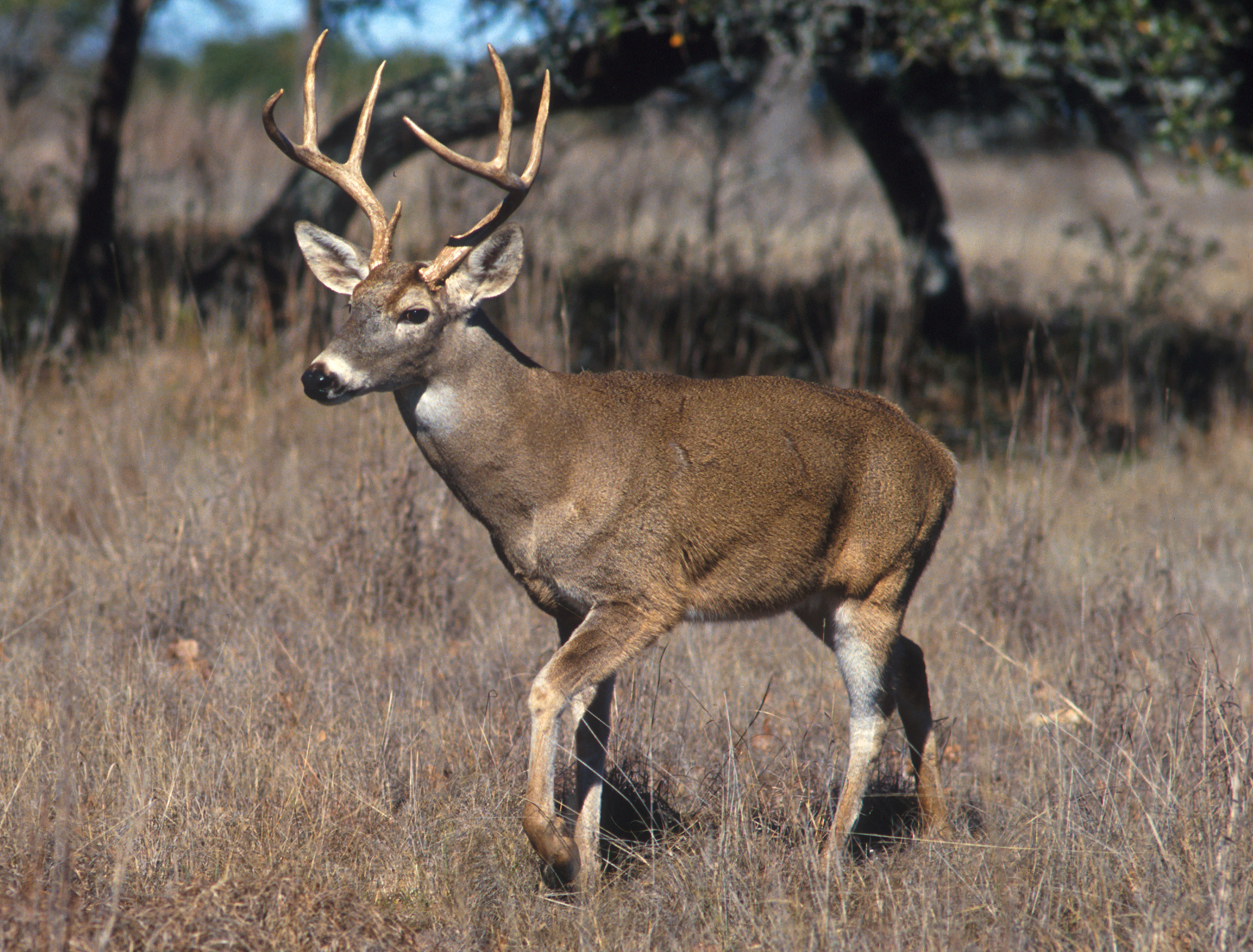
White-tailed deer

The even-toed ungulates are ungulates whose weight is borne about equally by the third and fourth toes, rather than mostly or entirely by the third as in perissodactyls. There are about 220 artiodactyl species, including many that are of great economic importance to humans.

- Family: Tayassuidae (peccaries)
  - Genus: Dicotyles
    - Collared peccary, Dicotyles tajacu LC
  - Genus: Tayassu
    - White-lipped peccary, Tayassu pecari NT
- Family: Camelidae (camels, llamas)
  - Genus: Lama
    - Guanaco, Lama guanicoe LR/lc
    - Vicuña, Lama vicugna LR/cd
- Family: Cervidae (deer)
  - Subfamily: Capreolinae
    - Genus: Blastocerus
      - Marsh deer, Blastocerus dichotomus VU
    - Genus: Hippocamelus
      - Taruca, Hippocamelus antisensis DD
    - Genus: Mazama
      - Red brocket, Mazama americana DD
      - Dwarf brocket, Mazama chunyi DD
      - Gray brocket, Mazama gouazoupira DD
    - Genus: Odocoileus
      - White-tailed deer, Odocoileus virginianus LR/lc
    - Genus: Pudu
      - Northern pudu, Pudu mephistophiles LR/nt
  - Subfamily: Cervinae
    - Genus: Dama
      - European fallow deer, D. dama LC introduced

=== Infraclass: Metatheria ===
==== Order: Didelphimorphia (common opossums) ====
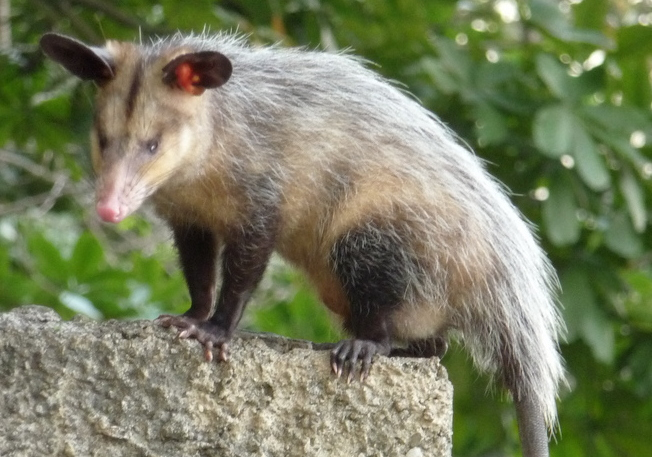
Common opossum

Didelphimorphia is the order of common opossums of the Western Hemisphere. Opossums probably diverged from the basic South American marsupials in the late Cretaceous or early Paleocene. They are small to medium-sized marsupials, about the size of a large house cat, with a long snout and prehensile tail.

- Family: Didelphidae (American opossums)
  - Subfamily: Caluromyinae
    - Genus: Caluromys
      - Brown-eared woolly opossum, Caluromys lanatus LR/nt
    - Genus: Caluromysiops
      - Black-shouldered opossum, Caluromysiops irrupta VU
    - Genus: Glironia
      - Bushy-tailed opossum, Glironia venusta VU
  - Subfamily: Didelphinae
    - Genus: Chironectes
      - Water opossum, Chironectes minimus LR/nt
    - Genus: Didelphis
      - Common opossum, Didelphis marsupialis LR/lc
    - Genus: Gracilinanus
      - Aceramarca gracile opossum, Gracilinanus aceramarcae CR
      - Agile gracile opossum, Gracilinanus agilis LR/nt
    - Genus: Hyladelphys
      - Kalinowski's mouse opossum, Hyladelphys kalinowskii DD
    - Genus: Marmosa
      - Anderson's mouse opossum, Marmosa andersoni CR
      - Rufous mouse opossum, Marmosa lepida LR/nt
      - Linnaeus's mouse opossum, Marmosa murina LR/lc
      - Bare-tailed woolly mouse opossum, Marmosa regina LR/lc
      - Robinson's mouse opossum, Marmosa robinsoni LR/lc
      - Red mouse opossum, Marmosa rubra LR/lc
    - Genus: Marmosops
      - Tschudi's slender opossum, Marmosops impavidus LR/nt
      - White-bellied slender opossum, Marmosops noctivagus LR/lc
      - Delicate slender opossum, Marmosops parvidens LR/nt
    - Genus: Metachirus
      - Brown four-eyed opossum, Metachirus nudicaudatus LR/lc
    - Genus: Monodelphis
      - Sepia short-tailed opossum, Monodelphis adusta LR/lc
      - Emilia's short-tailed opossum, Monodelphis emiliae VU
      - Osgood's short-tailed opossum, Monodelphis osgoodi VU
    - Genus: Philander
      - Anderson's four-eyed opossum, Philander andersoni LR/lc
      - Gray four-eyed opossum, Philander opossum LR/lc
    - Genus: Thylamys
      - White-bellied fat-tailed mouse opossum, Thylamys pallidior LR/lc
      - Tate's fat-tailed mouse opossum, Thylamys tatei DD

==== Order: Paucituberculata (shrew opossums) ====
There are six extant species of shrew opossum. They are small shrew-like marsupials confined to the Andes.

- Family: Caenolestidae
  - Genus: Caenolestes
    - Gray-bellied caenolestid, C. caniventer LC
  - Genus: Lestoros
    - Incan caenolestid, L. inca LC

== See also ==
- List of chordate orders
- List of Peruvian monkey species
- List of prehistoric mammals
- Lists of mammals by region
- Mammal classification
- List of mammals described in the 2000s
