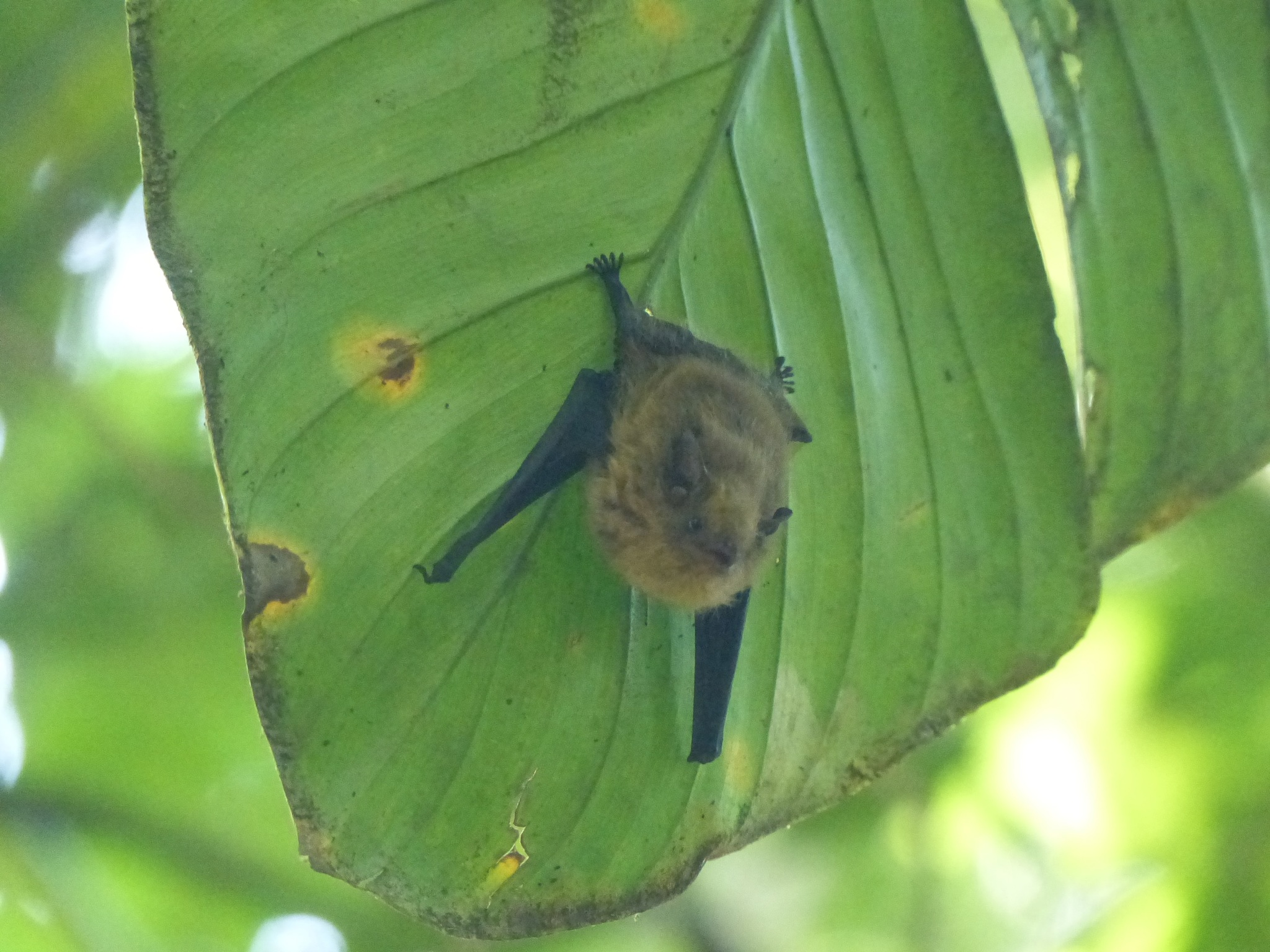

Conservation status
- Least Concern (IUCN 3.1)

Scientific classification
- Domain: Eukaryota
- Kingdom: Animalia
- Phylum: Chordata
- Class: Mammalia
- Order: Chiroptera
- Family: Emballonuridae
- Genus: Centronycteris
- Species: C. centralis

Binomial name
- Centronycteris centralis Thomas, 1912
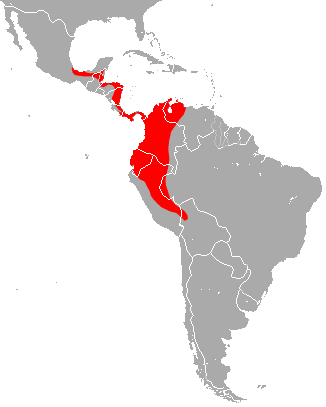
- Thomas's shaggy bat range

= Thomas's shaggy bat =

Species of bat

The Thomas's shaggy bat (Centronycteris centralis) is a bat species from Central and South America. It was previously included in the shaggy bat but Simmons and Handley (1998) showed that the species were distinct.

== Taxonomy ==
It was described as a new species in 1912 by British mammalogist Oldfield Thomas. The holotype had been collected by H. J. Watson in 1898 in Panama. Its species name "centralis" is Latin for "in the middle."

== Description ==
The fur of its back is gray while the fur around its eyes and near its uropatagium is reddish. Its ventral fur is yellowish. Despite being in the sac-winged bat family, it lacks wing sacs. It is a small species, with individuals weighing only 4–6 g (0.14–0.21 oz). Its forearm length is approximately 45 mm (1.8 in). Its dental formula is 1.1.2.33.1.2.3 for a total of 32 teeth.

== Biology and ecology ==
It is nocturnal, roosting in sheltered places during the day such as hollow trees. It forages for its insect prey with a "slow and maneuverable" flight. It is usually found at low elevations of 0–300 m (0–984 ft) above sea level, but has been documented at up 1,450 m (4,760 ft).

It is found in Belize, Bolivia, Colombia, Costa Rica, Ecuador, Guatemala, Honduras, Mexico, Nicaragua, Panama, Peru, and Venezuela.
