= Canaanimico =

Canaanimico Temporal range: Late Oligocene (Deseadan) ~26.5 Ma

Scientific classification (disputed)
- Kingdom: Animalia
- Phylum: Chordata
- Class: Mammalia
- Order: Primates
- Suborder: Haplorhini
- Family: †Homunculidae (see text)
- Subfamily: †Soriacebinae (see text)
- Genus: †Canaanimico; Marivaux et al. 2016

Type species
- †Canaanimico amazonensis Marivaux et al. 2016

Species
- C. amazonensis

Single-species extinct genus of monkeys

Canaanimico is an extinct genus of medium-sized New World monkeys from the Late Oligocene (approximately 26.5 Ma, Deseadan in the SALMA classification) fossiliferous fluvio-lacustrine Chambira Formation of the Ucayali Basin in Amazonian Peru. The genus was described by Marivaux et al. in 2016 and the type species is C. amazonensis.

== Classification ==
Marivaux et al. placed the genus in the subfamily Soriacebinae, of the family Homunculidae, while Silvestro et al. (2017) attribute an incertae sedis status for the family and subfamily to the genus. Marivaux et al. proposed a close relation with the Miocene South American genera Soriacebus (Santacrucian) and Mazzonicebus (Colhuehuapian).

== Description ==
Canaanimico was described by Marivaux et al. on the basis of two isolated upper molars collected at the Contamana fossil locality. The authors inferred that based on dental microwear patterns recorded on one upper molar Canaanimico possibly was a fruit and hard-object eater. Silvestro et al. estimated a body mass of 2,000 grams (4.4 lb) for Canaanimico, making it a medium-sized New World monkey.

== Paleoecology ==
Location of the Chambira Formation in Peru

Fossils of Canaanimico were found in the Late Oligocene (Deseadan) Chambira Formation of the Ucayali Basin in Amazonian Peru. The formation, a sequence of red claystones and paleosols with intercalated conglomerates and sandstones, and gypsum layers, has been dated on the basis of zircons in a tuff bed in the formation, providing an age of 26.56 ± 0.07 Ma. The formation was deposited in a tectonically relatively calm tropical fluvio-lacustrine environment with oxbow lakes.

The Chambira Formation has provided a rich mammal assemblage of Chambiramys shipiborum, C. sylvaticus, Deseadomys cf. arambourgi, Loretomys minutus, Palaeosteiromys amazonensis, Plesiosteiromys newelli, Scleromys praecursor, Ucayalimys crassidens, Abderites sp., aff. Eosallamys sp., cf. Neoglyptatelus sp., and indeterminate Adelphomyinae, Anthropoidea, Astrapotheriidae, Caenolestidae, Caviomorpha, Chinchilloidea, Emballonuridae, Erethizontoidea, Herpetotheriidae, Interatheriinae, Litopterna, Marsupialia, Microbiotheria, Mylodontidae, Mylodontoidea, Notoungulata, Octodontoidea, Palaeothentidae, Pampatheriidae, Rhinolophoidea, Tolypeutinae, Toxodontidae, Typotheria and Vespertilionoidea.

Additionally, crocodylians and turtles of ?Balanerodus sp., Podocnemis sp., cf. Purussaurus sp., cf. Sebecus sp., and indeterminate frogs, Booidea, Caimaninae, Colubroidea, Gavialoidea and snakes were found in the formation, as well as fossil fishes of cf. Hydrolycus sp., Leporinus sp., cf. Phractocephalus sp., Potamotrygon sp., and indeterminate Actinopterygii, Cichlidae, Erythrinidae, Loricariidae and Pimelodidae.

== See also ==
- List of fossil primates of South America
- List of Peruvian monkey species
- Branisella, a contemporaneous New World monkey from Bolivia
- Honda Group, the Miocene "Monkey Beds" providing the richest assemblage of fossil New World monkeys
