= G. sylvestris =

G. sylvestris may refer to:

- Gallirallus sylvestris, the Lord Howe woodhen, a flightless bird species
- Glyphonycteris sylvestris, the tricolored big-eared bat, a bat species from South and Central America
