= Melanomys robustulus =

Conservation status
- Least Concern (IUCN 3.1)

Scientific classification
- Kingdom: Animalia
- Phylum: Chordata
- Class: Mammalia
- Order: Rodentia
- Family: Cricetidae
- Subfamily: Sigmodontinae
- Genus: Melanomys
- Species: M. robustulus

Binomial name
- Melanomys robustulus (Thomas, 1914)

Synonyms
- Oryzomys robustulus Thomas, 1914

Species of rodent

Melanomys robustulus, also known as the robust melanomys or robust dark rice rat, is a species of rodent in the genus Melanomys of family Cricetidae. It is found on the eastern slope of the Andes in Ecuador.
