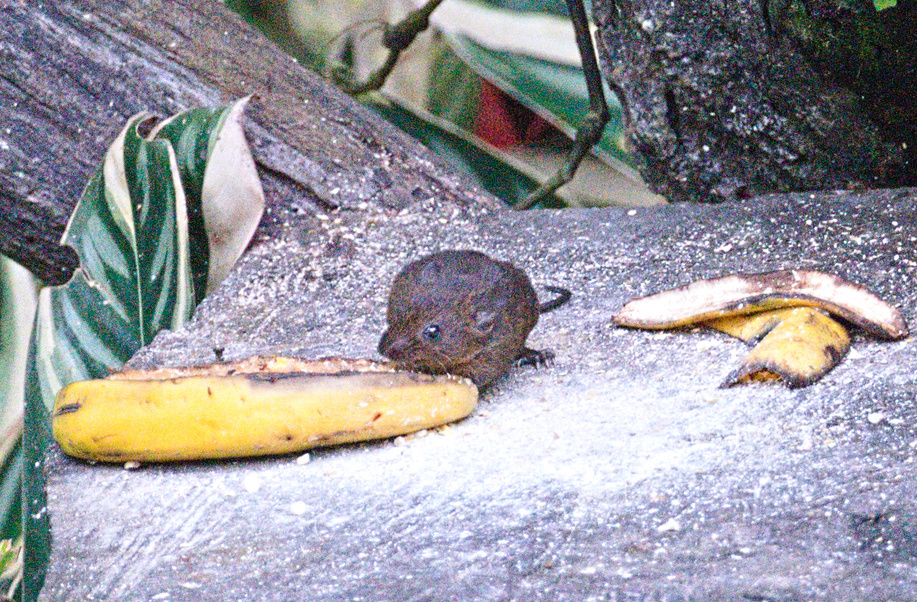
- M. caliginosus in Turrialba, Costa Rica alongside banana peels

Conservation status
- Least Concern (IUCN 3.1)

Scientific classification
- Kingdom: Animalia
- Phylum: Chordata
- Class: Mammalia
- Order: Rodentia
- Family: Cricetidae
- Subfamily: Sigmodontinae
- Genus: Melanomys
- Species: M. caliginosus

Binomial name
- Melanomys caliginosus (Tomes, 1860)

= Melanomys caliginosus =

Species of rodent

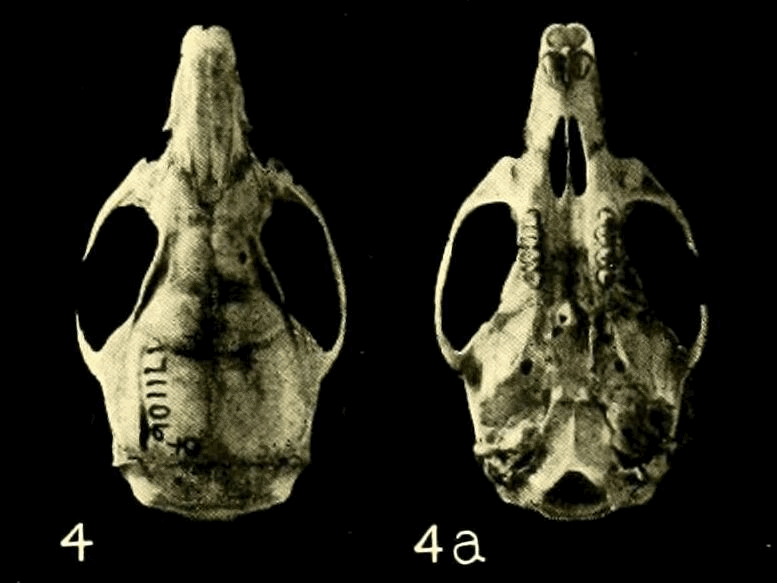
Skull of Melanomys caliginosus from Cerro Azul, Panama

Melanomys caliginosus, also known as the dusky melanomys or dusky rice rat, is a species of rodent in the genus Melanomys of family Cricetidae. It is found from Central America, in Honduras, Nicaragua, Costa Rica, and Panama, into South America, where it occurs in Venezuela, Colombia, and Ecuador. Populations currently classified under M. caliginosus may in fact include more than one species.
