= List of Peruvian monkey species =

There are about 52 known species of New World monkeys in Peru, particularly in the Peruvian Amazon. Among these are species of marmoset, woolly monkey, and others.

Common name	Scientific name	Conservation status
Black-capped squirrel monkey	Saimiri boliviensis	Least Concern
Goeldi's monkey	Callimico goeldii	Vulnerable
Golden-mantled tamarin	Saguinus tripartitus	Least Concern
Madidi titi monkey	Plecturocebus aureipalatii	Least Concern
Nancy Ma's night monkey	Aotus nancymaae	
Peruvian night monkey	Aotus miconax	Endangered
Purus red howler	Alouatta puruensis	Least Concern
Red titi monkey	Plecturocebus discolor	Least Concern
San Martin titi monkey	Plecturocebus oenanthe	Critically Endangered
Tufted capuchin monkey	Sapajus apella	Least Concern
Yellow-tailed woolly monkey	Oreonax flavicauda	Critically Endangered

== See also ==
- List of mammals of Peru
