= Melanomys zunigae =

Conservation status
- Critically endangered, possibly extinct (IUCN 3.1)

Scientific classification
- Kingdom: Animalia
- Phylum: Chordata
- Class: Mammalia
- Order: Rodentia
- Family: Cricetidae
- Subfamily: Sigmodontinae
- Genus: Melanomys
- Species: M. zunigae

Binomial name
- Melanomys zunigae (Sanborn, 1949)

Synonyms
- Oryzomys zunigae Sanborn, 1949

Species of rodent

Melanomys zunigae, also known as Zuniga's melanomys or Zuniga's dark rice rat, is a species of rodent in the genus Melanomys of family Cricetidae. Known only from a small region of coastal Peru, it is listed as "critically endangered" by the IUCN and may even be extinct.
