= Scolomys melanops =

Conservation status
- Least Concern (IUCN 3.1)

Scientific classification
- Kingdom: Animalia
- Phylum: Chordata
- Class: Mammalia
- Order: Rodentia
- Family: Cricetidae
- Subfamily: Sigmodontinae
- Genus: Scolomys
- Species: S. melanops

Binomial name
- Scolomys melanops Anthony, 1924

Species of rodent

Scolomys melanops, also known as the short-nosed scolomys, South American spiny mouse, Ecuadorian spiny mouse, or gray spiny mouse, is a species of rodent in the genus Scolomys of family Cricetidae. It is a forest mouse and was thought to be endemic to Ecuador but it is now known to have a wider distribution, being also present in part of Peru.

== Description ==
The South American spiny mouse has a total length of between 135 and 167 mm (5.3 and 6.6 in) including a tail of 55 to 77 mm (2.2 to 3.0 in). It has a short, broad head, a small body and a nearly naked tail. The dorsal pelage is short and dense and consists of a mixture of slender hairs with reddish or blackish tips and stouter spines of the same length that are darker at the tip, giving a grizzled appearance. The fur on the ventral surface has similar hairs and spines but they are a uniform grey colour. Morphologically this species is very similar to the closely related Ucayali spiny mouse (Scolomys ucayalensis). The differences are mostly in the skull characteristics and the dentition. The karyotype of S. melanops has 2n = 60 and FN = 78, while that of S. ucayalensis has 2n = 50, FN = 68.

== Distribution and habitat ==
This species is found in Ecuador on the eastern side of the Andes and also near Iquitos in eastern Peru, at altitudes between about 150 and 1,200 m (500 and 3,900 ft). Its habitat is primary and secondary forest, forest fragments, and cropland near forest borders. It does not seem to be arboreal and little is known of its biology, but pregnant females have been seen in March and April. The nest often includes fibres from the undergrowth palm Lepidocaryum tenue and the litter size averages 2.5.

== Status ==
S. melanops is thought to have a large range in the forests of tropical South America, and is thus presumed to have a large total population. It faces no particular threats, but deforestation may affect it locally. It lives in both primary and secondary forests and is present in several protected areas, and the International Union for Conservation of Nature has assessed its conservation status as being of "least concern".
