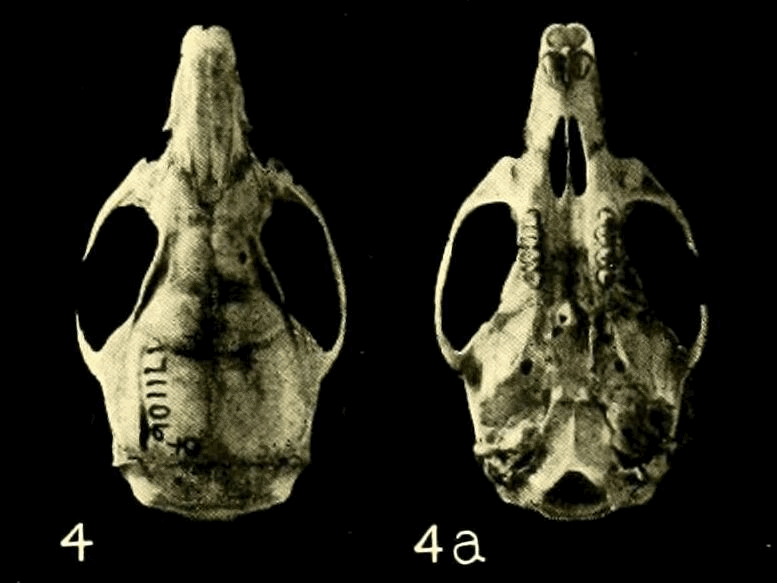
- Skull of Melanomys caliginosus from Cerro Azul, Panama.

Scientific classification
- Domain: Eukaryota
- Kingdom: Animalia
- Phylum: Chordata
- Class: Mammalia
- Order: Rodentia
- Family: Cricetidae
- Subfamily: Sigmodontinae
- Tribe: Oryzomyini
- Genus: Melanomys; Thomas, 1902

Type species
- Oryzomys phaeopus

Species
- Melanomys caliginosus Melanomys robustulus Melanomys zunigae

= Melanomys =

Genus of rodents

Melanomys is a genus of rodent in the tribe Oryzomyini of family Cricetidae, which is distributed in northern South America and adjacent Central America. It contains three species, two of which—Melanomys robustulus and Melanomys zunigae—have limited distributions. The third, Melanomys caliginosus, is more widely distributed, but may be a species complex.
