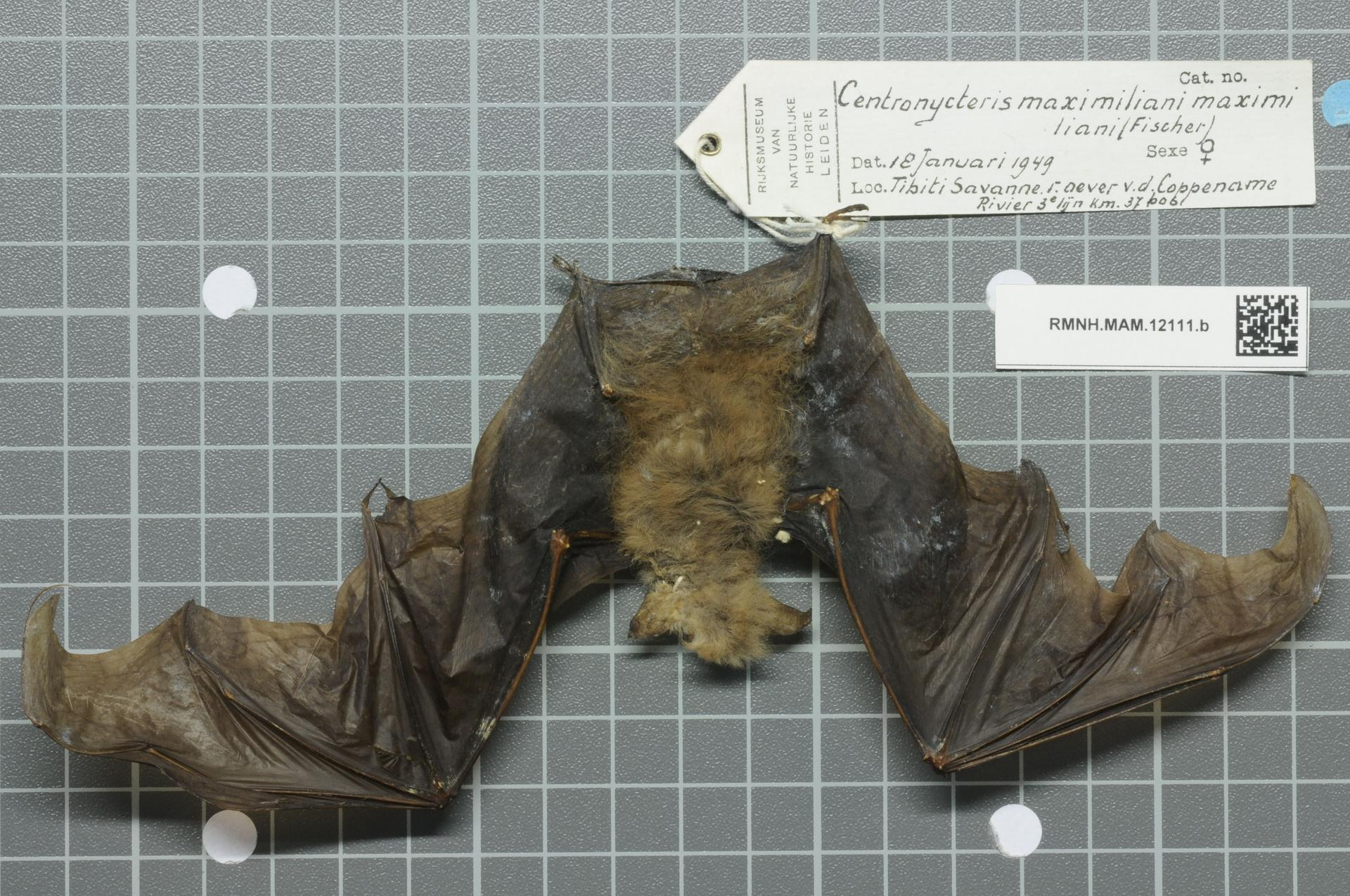
- Preserved specimen of Centronycteris maximiliani

Scientific classification
- Kingdom: Animalia
- Phylum: Chordata
- Class: Mammalia
- Order: Chiroptera
- Family: Emballonuridae
- Genus: Centronycteris (Gray, 1838)

Type species
- Vespertilio calcaratus Schinz, 1821

Species
- Centronycteris centralis; Centronycteris maximiliani

= Centronycteris =

Genus of bats

Centronycteris is a genus of sac-winged bats. It contains two species:

- Thomas's shaggy bat (C. centralis)
- Shaggy bat (C. maximiliani)
