= Scolomys =

Scientific classification
- Domain: Eukaryota
- Kingdom: Animalia
- Phylum: Chordata
- Class: Mammalia
- Order: Rodentia
- Family: Cricetidae
- Subfamily: Sigmodontinae
- Tribe: Oryzomyini
- Genus: Scolomys; Anthony, 1924

Type species
- Scolomys melanops Anthony, 1924

Species
- Scolomys melanops Scolomys ucayalensis

Genus of rodents

Scolomys is a genus of rodent in the tribe Oryzomyini of the family Cricetidae. Some evidence suggests that it is related to Zygodontomys. It is characterized, among other traits, by spiny fur. It contains two species, S. melanops and S. ucayalensis.

== Taxonomy ==
The genus Scolomys was first described by the American zoologist H. E. Anthony in 1920, to accommodate six specimens collected by the British-born American zoologist George Henry Hamilton Tate on the eastern slopes of the Andes in Ecuador. These specimens belonged to a single species Scolomys melanops, and for a long time the genus was considered to be monotypic. However, following survey work in the upper Amazon basin many decades later, a further species S. ucayalensis was described from northern Peru by Pacheco in 1991, followed by a third, S. juruaense from western Brazil by Patton and da Silva in 1994. In 2004, Gomez-Laverde and co-workers reviewed the systematics of the genus and its distribution, and suggested that S. juruaense was not sufficiently distinct from S. ucayalensis to warrant being classified as a separate species.

== Characteristics ==
Members of this genus are small rodents with a head-and-body length of 80 to 90 mm (3.1 to 3.5 in) and a tail of 55 to 77 mm (2.2 to 3.0 in). They have small, broad heads, with small rounded, nearly-naked ears, and short, dense, spiny fur. The upper parts are grizzled reddish-brown to black while the underparts are greyish. The dorsal pelage is a mixture of slender hairs with reddish or blackish tips, and stouter, flattened spines gradually darkening towards the end. The fore feet have five pads on the sole. The hind feet are broad and short, with hairy heels and naked soles, with five or six pads. The upper surface of the hind feet has long silvery hairs sprouting beside the nail bases but not hiding the nails. The tail is scantily-haired and has no terminal tuft of hair. The female has three pairs of mammae which feature distinguishes this genus from other members of the Oryzomyini tribe which have four pairs.
