= Rio Mayo titi monkey =

Conservation status
- Critically Endangered (IUCN 3.1)

Scientific classification
- Kingdom: Animalia
- Phylum: Chordata
- Class: Mammalia
- Order: Primates
- Family: Pitheciidae
- Genus: Plecturocebus
- Species: P. oenanthe

Binomial name
- Plecturocebus oenanthe (Thomas, 1924)
- Geographic range in South America

Synonyms
- Callicebus oenanthe Thomas, 1924

Species of New World monkey

The Rio Mayo titi monkey (Plecturocebus oenanthe) is a species of titi monkey, a type of New World monkey, endemic to Peru. The Rio Mayo titi, was thought previously to have a small range of origin in the Alto Mayo valley, but research has proven that the range extends southward and reaches the Bajo Mayo and Huallaga Central. It had been classified as vulnerable but due to major habitat loss and restricted living space, it is now classified as Critically Endangered. In October 2012, it was included in The World's 25 Most Endangered Primates list. An increase in deforestation is leading to the decrease in available living space for this titi monkey, forcing it to live in sympatry with another species of Callicebus. Yet in some areas, such drastic deforestation has resulted in extremely high population density. The Rio Mayo titi is better adapted to moderately populated areas, thus overpopulation negatively impacts the species. The forests the Rio Mayo titi lives in are being destroyed for agricultural purposes, leaving little forest for the monkeys. They were only seen a few times and featured in museums until 2003 when more research was done on them. In order for this species to survive, their forests need to be protected to avoid overpopulation. Different conservation groups are working to help P. oenanthe survive. Neotropical Primate Conservation, Proyecto Mono Tocón and Amazónicos para la Amazonia are working in the more southern areas to protect the monkey. The Rio Mayo titi is a fairly inconspicuous creature, making observation and research difficult to obtain. Therefore, the traditional use of transect observation to monitor the monkey's population, is less effective. Instead, other methods of calculating the titi monkey's density in certain areas have been taken, such as research into the species-specific calls endemic to a certain area.

== Location, habitat and activity ==
Rio Mayo titis usually live in dry woodland areas with a lot of vines and plants. They are found in Peru in the northern part of the Department of San Martin, at altitudes of 750–950 meters and also in the foothills of the Andes.

One P. oenanthe family was studied by scientist DeLuycker from October 2004 to September 2005. The studied family consisted of a mother and father, two offspring, and a baby born within the study period. The family was observed to live in bamboo stands and low forests with trees with a mean height of 6.8 meters. The family used only five sleeping sites during the year-long study time, two of them only rarely.

Sleeping and resting was the most common activity, followed by traveling, and then eating and foraging. The P. oenanthe also socialized with others of their own kind. However, forest degradation and disturbed habitats had a negative effect on P. oenanthe sociability.

== Diet ==
The diet of the Rio Mayo titi consists of mostly leaves, seeds, fruits, and arthropods. In one study, it was found that 54% of their diet was fruit, and 22% insects (consisting of at least 10 different types of insects), with the remainder consisting of leaves, tendrils, meristems, flowers and seeds.

The 22% of the P. oenanthe diet that consists of insects is gathered in a variety of ways. There are three main types of foraging technique that the species uses to catch insects: lunging and grabbing exposed prey, biting and inspecting hidden prey, and stealth foraging or scanning for prey. Out of the three techniques, the most frequently used technique for hunting insects was found to be lunging and grabbing exposed prey. They have a high success rate of catching insects, reaching up to 83%. This species' ability to hunt insects so easily is especially important for survival in times of scarce food availability.

== Diseases ==
The cestode Atriotaenia megastoma has only recently been studied in non-human hosts. This parasite, a type of tapeworm, has been found in numerous species of monkeys in the Peru area such as Saimiri sciureus and Saimiri boliviensis. This parasite requires an intermediate host usually found in the soil fauna. The host then acquires the parasite by accidentally ingesting the intermediate host from the soil. Work performed in Peru shows that P. oenanthe is a new definitive host for this parasite.

In February and October 2004, six sightings of this parasite were found in the small intestines of two different P. oenanthe monkeys. These monkeys were male pets, donated to the experiment by local villagers. One monkey died of old age while the other died from hepatic cirrhosis. Before their death, samples of Atriotaenia megastoma were taken, dehydrated, and preserved in order to study their anatomy and reproductive organs. These new preserved specimens allowed for a new and better understanding of this parasite. Ultimately, the study showed that P. oenanthe is a new, definitive host for the parasite, and could be another factor in the species' decline.

== Conservation efforts ==
After discovering the distribution of the species and where it primarily lives, the next step in conserving it is determining the densities of the species, creating protected areas specifically for this animal, and expanding existing ones. To find the density of the P. oenanthe, a triangulation method is used, where three points are set up and the species is observed within the area created by these points. While density was measured by using this method and also examining the trees by their density, height, and distance from one another, human disturbance is also monitored. This study described was performed in Ojos de Agua in Peru. This study was part of a larger study created by Program Management Team (PMT) to study the habitat requirements of P. oenanthe and exploring the possibility of creating corridors between species fragmented distributions.

== See also ==
List of mammals of Peru
