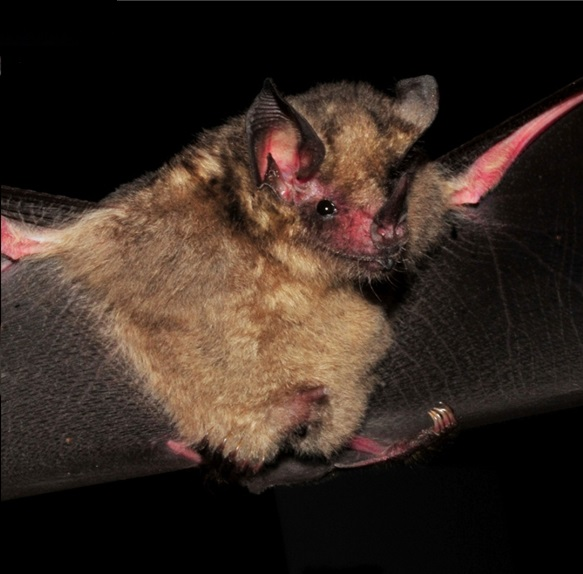

Conservation status
- Least Concern (IUCN 3.1)

Scientific classification
- Domain: Eukaryota
- Kingdom: Animalia
- Phylum: Chordata
- Class: Mammalia
- Order: Chiroptera
- Family: Phyllostomidae
- Genus: Glyphonycteris
- Species: G. sylvestris

Binomial name
- Glyphonycteris sylvestris Thomas, 1896
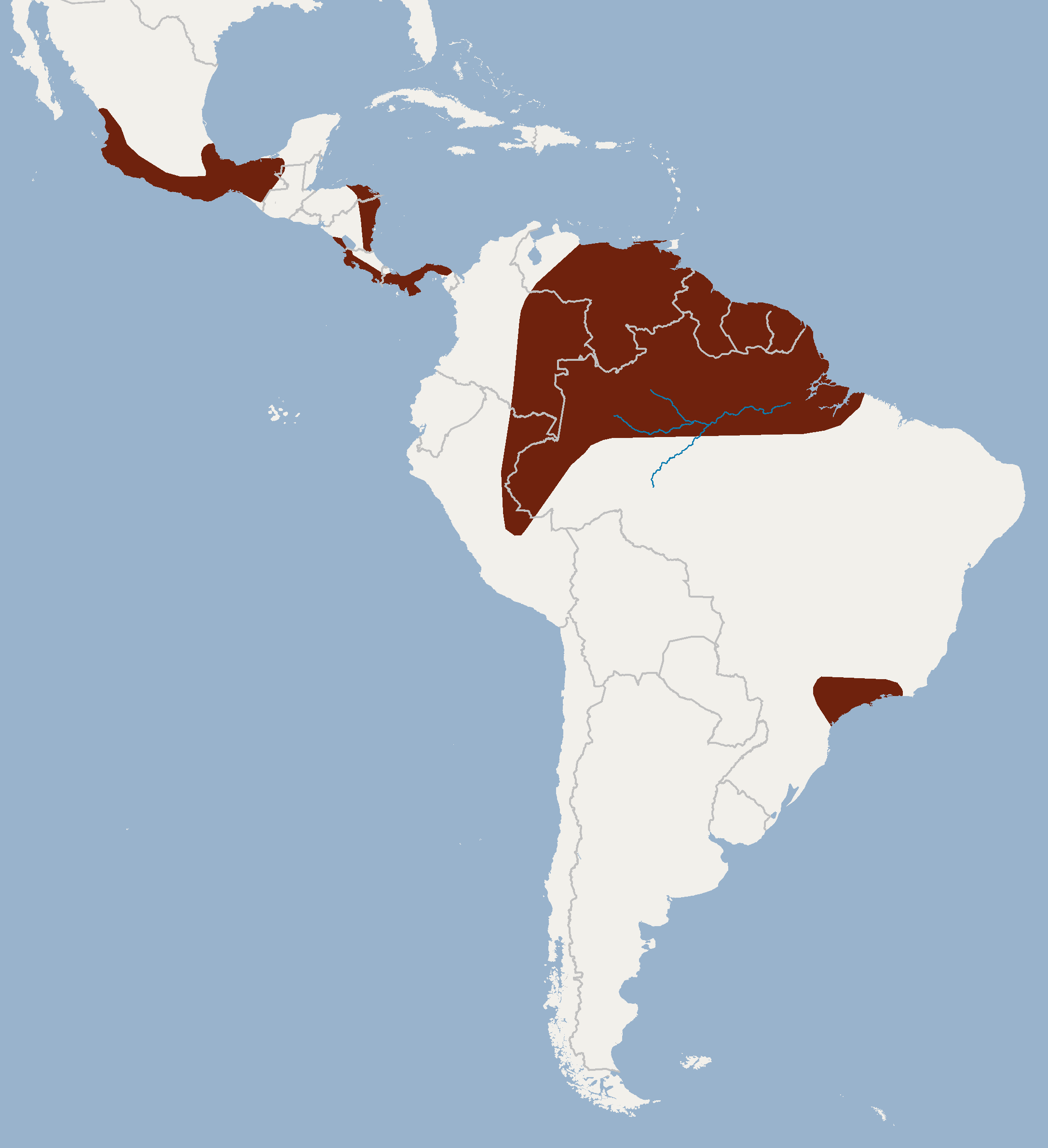

= Tricolored big-eared bat =

Species of bat

The tricolored big-eared bat (Glyphonycteris sylvestris) is a bat species from South and Central America.

== Description ==
Individuals weigh 7–11 g (0.25–0.39 oz) and have forearm lengths of 37–42 mm (1.5–1.7 in). The fur on its back is long, woolly, and dark brown. Individual hairs are tricolored, with a dark basal band, lighter middle band, and dark distal band. Its dental formula is 2.1.2.32.1.3.3 for a total of 34 teeth.

== Biology and ecology ==
It is likely insectivorous and frugivorous. It is nocturnal, roosting in sheltered places during the day such as hollow trees and caves. These roosts consist of a colonies of up to 75 individuals.

== Range and habitat ==
It is found in Bolivia, Brazil, Colombia, Costa Rica, French Guiana, Guyana, Honduras, Mexico, Nicaragua, Panama, Peru, Suriname, Trinidad and Tobago, and Venezuela. It is generally found at elevations lower than 800 m (2,600 ft) above sea level, but has been documented up to 1,100 m (3,600 ft).

As of 2018, it is considered a least-concern species by the IUCN.
