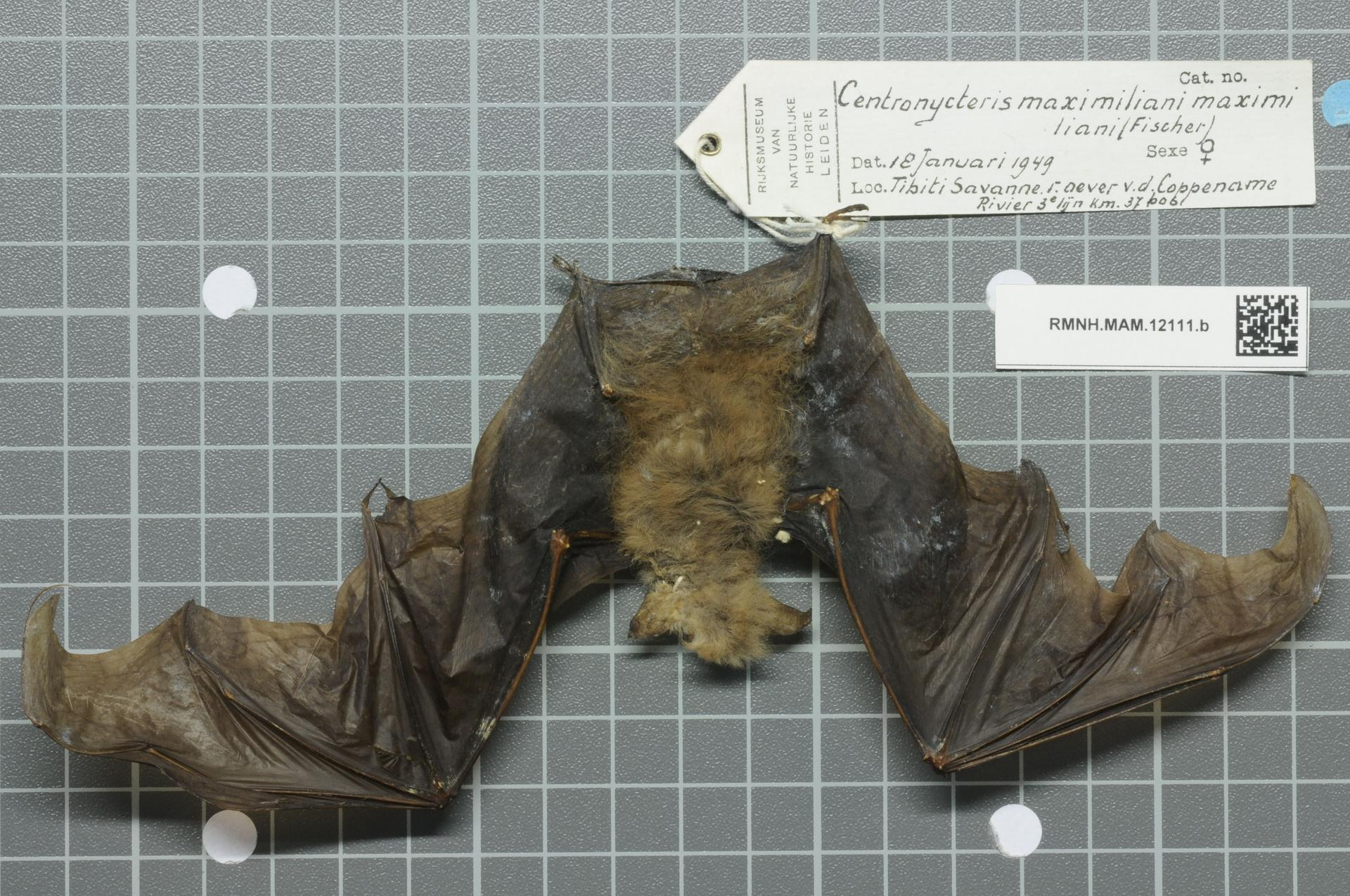

Conservation status
- Least Concern (IUCN 3.1)

Scientific classification
- Kingdom: Animalia
- Phylum: Chordata
- Class: Mammalia
- Order: Chiroptera
- Family: Emballonuridae
- Genus: Centronycteris
- Species: C. maximiliani

Binomial name
- Centronycteris maximiliani J. Fischer, 1829
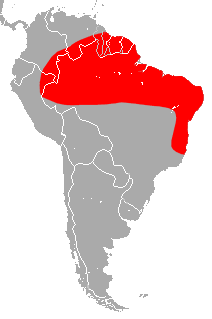
- Shaggy bat range

= Shaggy bat =

Species of bat

The shaggy bat (Centronycteris maximiliani) is a bat species from northern South America. It appears to be a slow flier and has a rather regular pattern of foraging in its home range, a feature shared with other emballonurids. It is an aerial insectivore.
