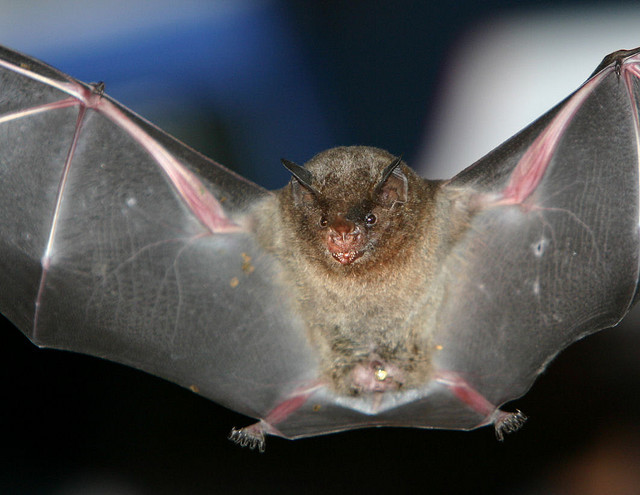
- Silky short-tailed bat (Carollia brevicauda)

Scientific classification
- Domain: Eukaryota
- Kingdom: Animalia
- Phylum: Chordata
- Class: Mammalia
- Order: Chiroptera
- Family: Phyllostomidae
- Subfamily: Carolliinae; Miller, 1924

Genera
- Carollia - short-tailed bats Rhinophylla - little fruit bats

= Carolliinae =

Subfamily of bats

Carolliinae is a subfamily of bats.

== Classification ==
Subfamily Carolliinae

- Genus: Carollia - Short-tailed Leaf-nosed Bats
  - Benkeith's short-tailed bat, Carollia benkeithi
  - Silky short-tailed bat, Carollia brevicauda
  - Chestnut short-tailed bat, Carollia castanea
  - Colombian short-tailed bat, Carollia colombiana
  - Manu short-tailed bat, Carollia manu
  - Carollia monohernandezi
  - Seba's short-tailed bat, Carollia perspicillata
  - Sowell's short-tailed bat, Carollia sowelli
  - Gray short-tailed bat, Carollia subrufa
- Genus: Rhinophylla
  - Hairy little fruit bat, Rhinophylla alethina
  - Fischer's little fruit bat, Rhinophylla fischerae
  - Dwarf little fruit bat, Rhinophylla pumilio
