= Dashe's nectar bat =

Scientific classification
- Kingdom: Animalia
- Phylum: Chordata
- Class: Mammalia
- Order: Chiroptera
- Family: Phyllostomidae
- Genus: Hsunycteris
- Species: H. dashe

Binomial name
- Hsunycteris dashe Velazco, Soto-Centeno, Fleck, Voss and Simmons, 2017

Species of bat

Dashe's nectar bat (Hsunycteris dashe) is a bat species from Bolivia, Colombia, Ecuador, and Peru. It was cited as a member of the genus Hsunycteris before it was formally described.
