= Hsunycteris =

Scientific classification
- Domain: Eukaryota
- Kingdom: Animalia
- Phylum: Chordata
- Class: Mammalia
- Order: Chiroptera
- Family: Phyllostomidae
- Subfamily: Lonchophyllinae
- Tribe: Hsunycterini; Parlos, Timm, Swier, Zeballos and Baker, 2014
- Genus: Hsunycteris; Parlos, Timm, Swier, Zeballos and Baker, 2014

Type species
- Lonchophylla cadenai Woodman and Timm 2006

Species
- Hsunycteris cadenai Hsunycteris dashe Hsunycteris pattoni Hsunycteris thomasi

Genus of bats

Hsunycteris is a genus of bats in the family Phyllostomidae and the only genus in the tribe Hsunycterini.

== List of species ==
Genus Hsunycteris

- Cadena's long-tongued bat, Hsunycteris cadenai
- Dashe's nectar bat, Hsunycteris dashe
- Patton's long-tongued bat, Hsunycteris pattoni
- Thomas's nectar bat, Hsunycteris thomasi
