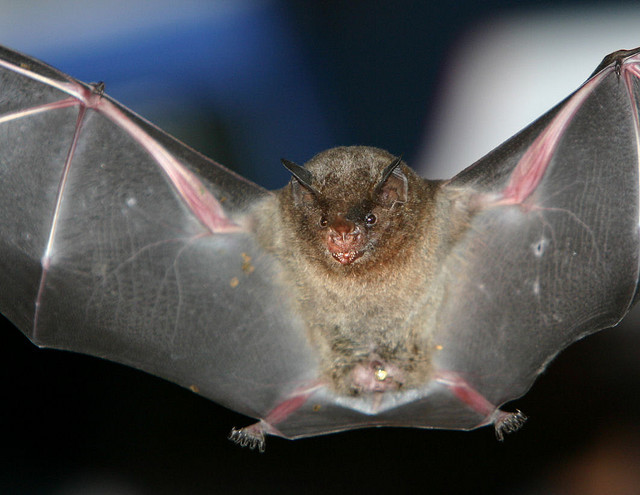
- Silky short-tailed bat (Carollia brevicauda)

Scientific classification
- Domain: Eukaryota
- Kingdom: Animalia
- Phylum: Chordata
- Class: Mammalia
- Order: Chiroptera
- Family: Phyllostomidae
- Subfamily: Carolliinae
- Genus: Carollia; Gray, 1838

Type species
- Carollia braziliensis Gray, 1838

Species
- Carollia benkeithi Carollia brevicauda Carollia castanea Carollia colombiana Carollia manu Carollia monohernandezi Carollia perspicillata Carollia sowelli Carollia subrufa...

= Carollia =

Genus of bats

Carollia is a genus of bats often referred to as the short-tailed fruit bats. Along with the genus Rhinophylla, Carollia makes up the subfamily Carolliinae of family Phyllostomidae, the leaf-nosed bats. Currently, nine species of Carollia are recognized, with a number having been described since 2002. Members of this genus are found throughout tropical regions of Central and South America but do not occur on Caribbean islands other than Trinidad and Tobago. Bats of the genus Carollia often are among the most abundant mammals in neotropical ecosystems and play important roles as seed dispersers, particularly of pioneer plants such as those of the genera Piper, Cecropia, Solanum, and Vismia. Carollia are primarily frugivorous; however, C. perspicillata, C. castanea, and C. subrufa are known to feed on insects.

Genus Carollia – short-tailed leaf-nosed bats

- Benkeith's short-tailed bat, C. benkeithi
- Silky short-tailed bat, C. brevicauda
- Chestnut short-tailed bat, C. castanea
- Manu short-tailed bat, C. manu
- Mono's short-tailed bat, C. monohernandezi
- Seba's short-tailed bat, C. perspicillata
- Sowell's short-tailed bat, C. sowelli
- Gray short-tailed bat, C. subrufa

== Vocal Diversity ==
There is evidence that there are distinct differences in vocal behaviour during physical interference interactions at the perch between sympatrically living, closely related species of Carollia. This diversity of vocal behaviour may arise from different ecological pressures during allopatric speciation, and may also be an indicator of differences in species social organisation.
