= Sakeji horseshoe bat =

Conservation status
- Data Deficient (IUCN 3.1)

Scientific classification
- Kingdom: Animalia
- Phylum: Chordata
- Class: Mammalia
- Order: Chiroptera
- Family: Rhinolophidae
- Genus: Rhinolophus
- Species: R. sakejiensis

Binomial name
- Rhinolophus sakejiensis Cotterill, 2002
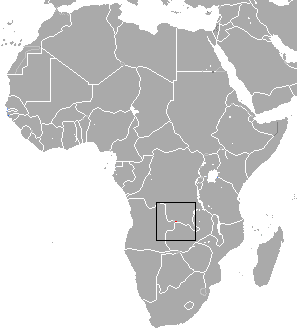
- Sakeji Horseshoe Bat range

Species of bat

The Sakeji horseshoe bat (Rhinolophus sakejiensis) is a species of bat in the family Rhinolophidae. It is endemic to Zambia. Its natural habitats are subtropical and tropical dry and moist lowland forest, and moist savanna. It is threatened by habitat loss. It was discovered in 2000.
