= Ben E. Keith Company =

American food and beverage distributor

- Formerly: Harkrider-Keith-Cooke Company
- Industry: Foodservice distributing
- Founded: 1906 in Fort Worth, Texas, United States
- Founder: Ben E. Keith
- Headquarters: Fort Worth, Texas
- Key people: Ben E. Keith (President, General manager (1918–1959); Howard Hallam (CEO (1979–present)
- Revenue: $6.8 billion
- Number of employees: 6,000
- Divisions: Food & beverages
- Website: benekeith.com

The Ben E. Keith Company is an American distributor of food and beverage products founded in 1906. The company was originally named the Harkrider-Keith-Cooke Company but adopted its current name in 1931. It is headquartered in Fort Worth, Texas and is a distributor of food service throughout the United States, and also distributes Anheuser-Busch products in the state of Texas. The company distributes through its two operating divisions. The Food Division supplies a full line of produce, frozen foods, meats, dry groceries, refrigerated foods, paper goods, equipment and supplies to restaurants, hospitals, schools, nursing homes and other institutional businesses. The Beverage Division sells Budweiser, Bud Light, Bud Ice, Michelob Ultra, Busch, Natural Light, and other Anheuser-Busch products. Other beverage products include energy drinks, craft and import beer brands, spirits, and wine.

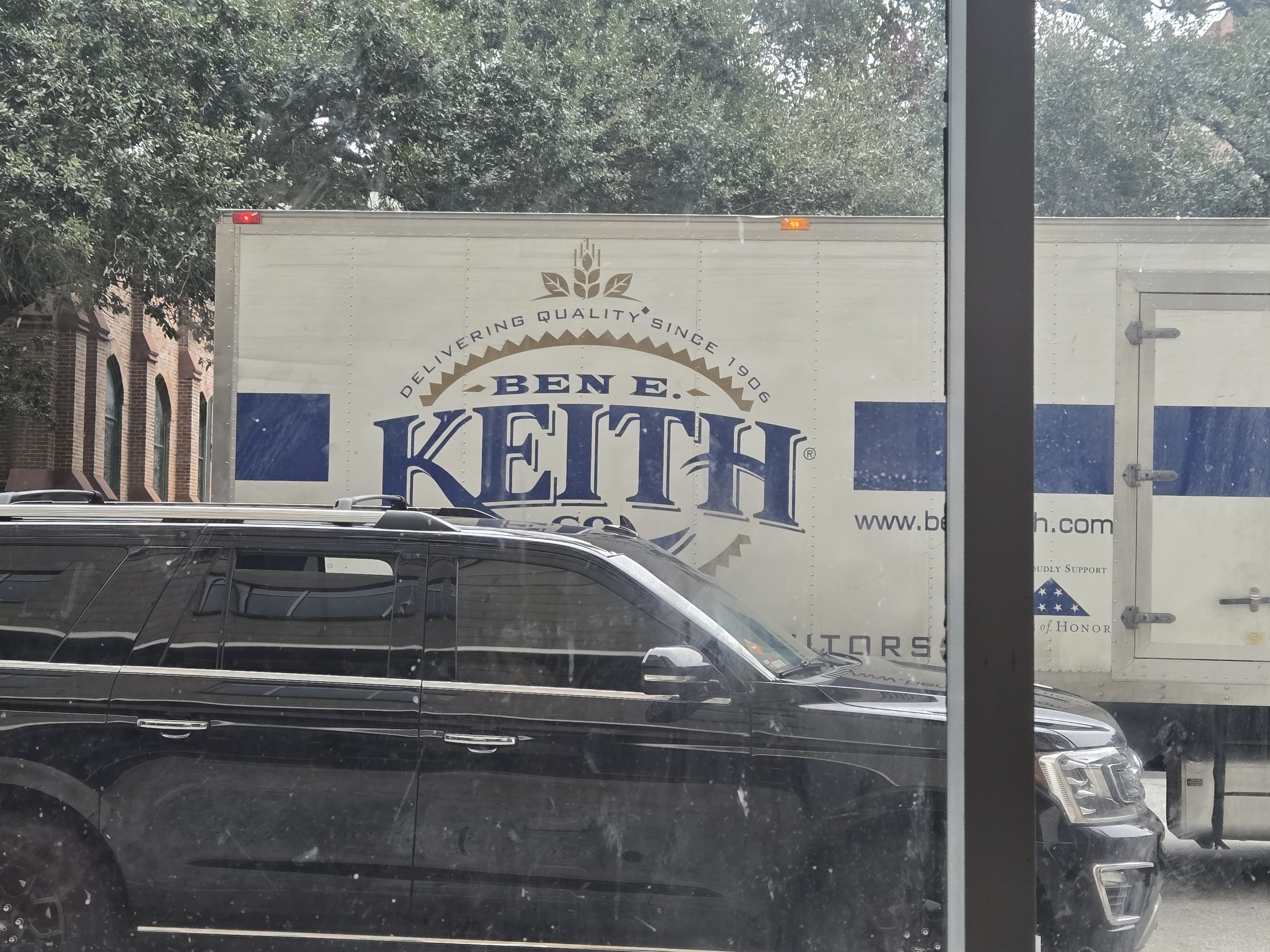
Delivery Truck for Ben E. Keith

== Legacy ==
Following a large donation to Texas Tech University, a newly discovered species of bat was named after the company's founder, Ben E. Keith—Benkeith's short-tailed bat (Carollia benkeithi).
