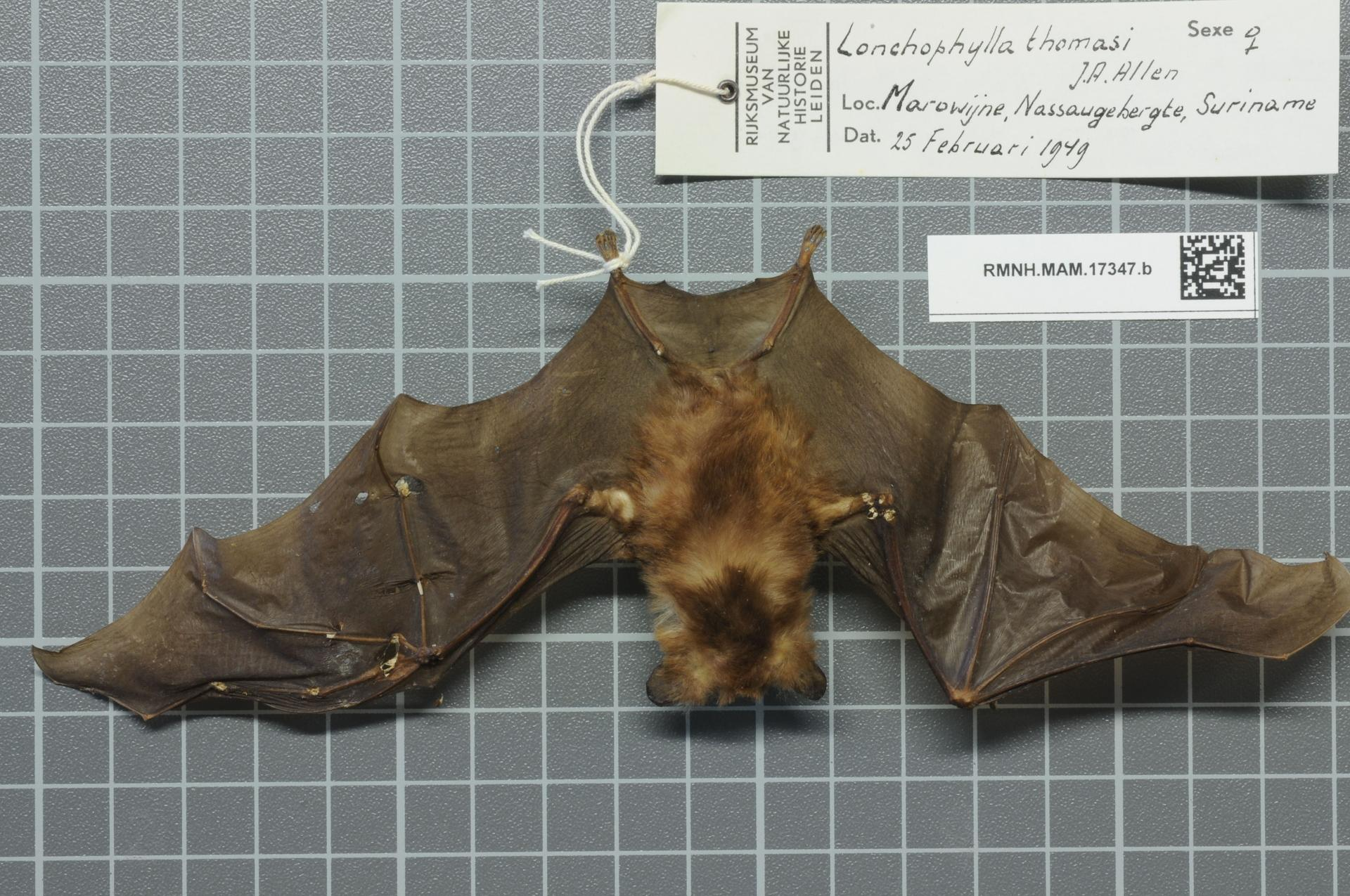

Conservation status
- Least Concern (IUCN 3.1)

Scientific classification
- Kingdom: Animalia
- Phylum: Chordata
- Class: Mammalia
- Order: Chiroptera
- Family: Phyllostomidae
- Genus: Hsunycteris
- Species: H. thomasi

Binomial name
- Hsunycteris thomasi (Allen et al., 1904)
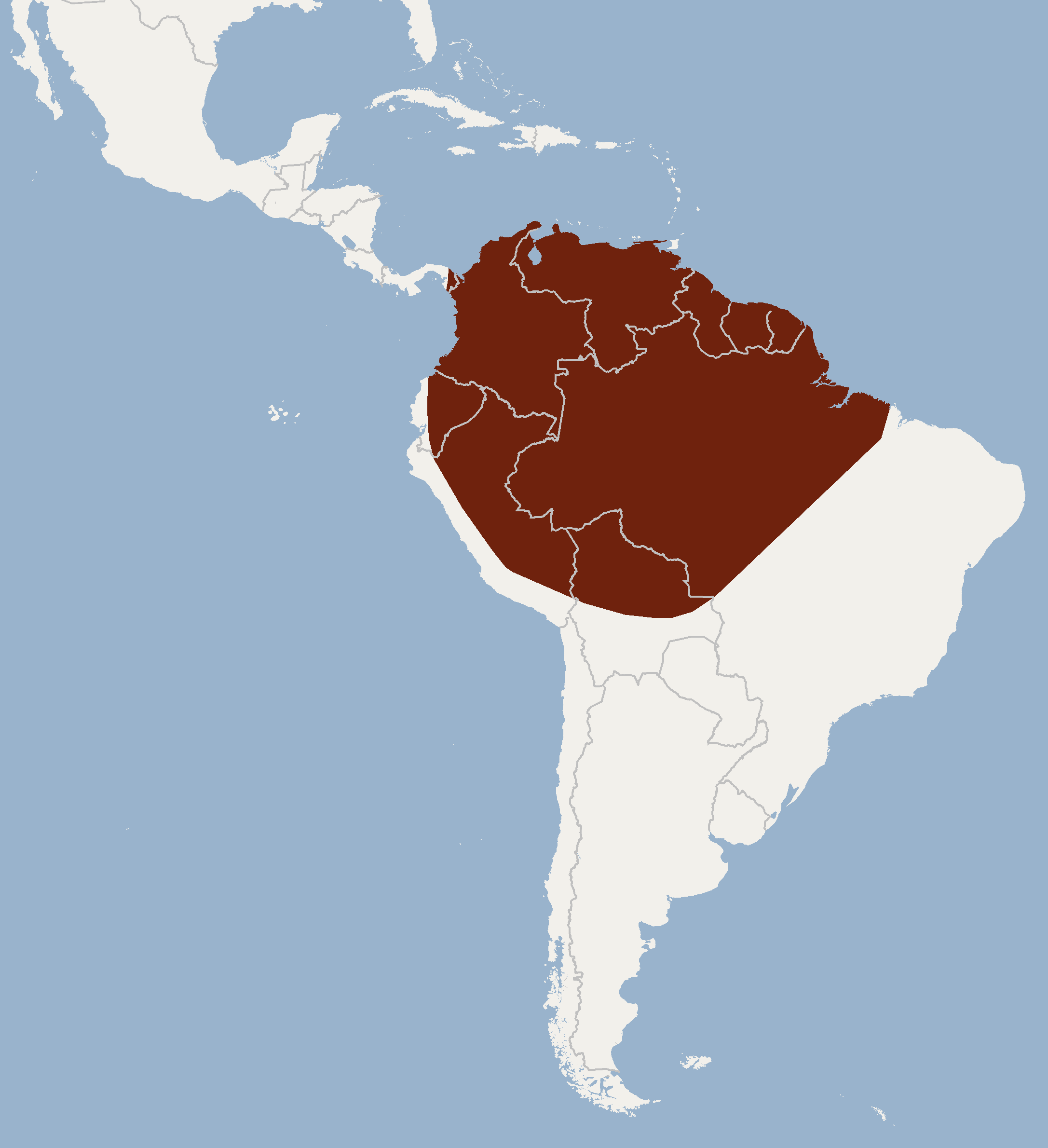

= Thomas's nectar bat =

Species of bat

Thomas's nectar bat (Hsunycteris thomasi) is a bat species from South and Central America. Thomas's nectar bat pollinates the vine Marcgravia.
