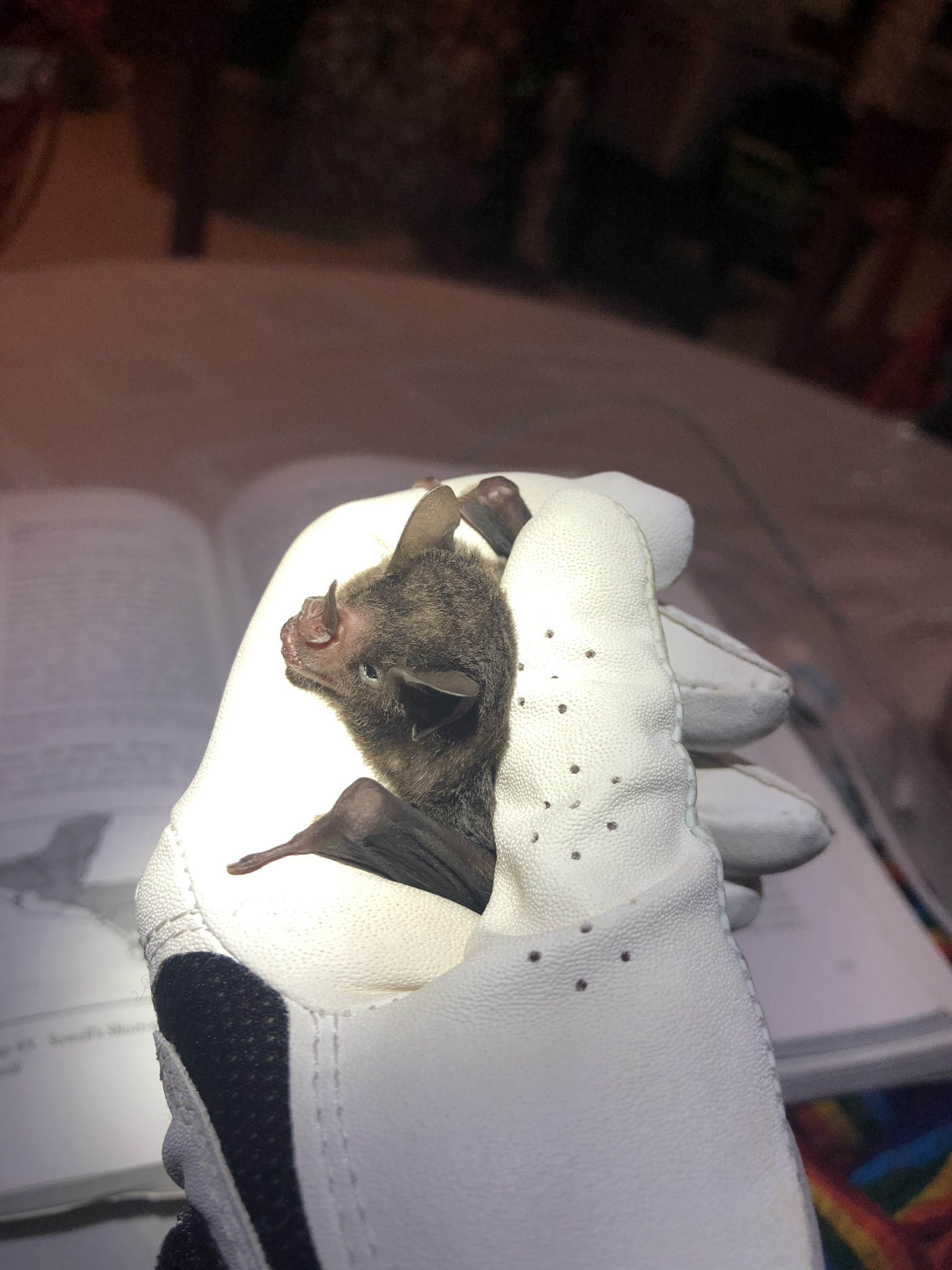

Conservation status
- Least Concern (IUCN 3.1)

Scientific classification
- Kingdom: Animalia
- Phylum: Chordata
- Class: Mammalia
- Order: Chiroptera
- Family: Phyllostomidae
- Genus: Carollia
- Species: C. sowelli

Binomial name
- Carollia sowelli Baker, Solari & Hoffmann, 2002
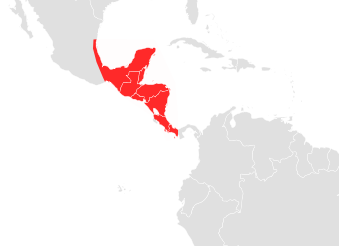
- Sowell's short-tailed bat range

= Sowell's short-tailed bat =

Species of bat

Sowell's short-tailed bat (Carollia sowelli) is a common bat species in the family Phyllostomidae. It is found from San Luis Potosi (Mexico) through Central America to west Panama. The species was split off from Carollia brevicauda in 2002 based on genetic evidence. It is also closely related to Carollia perspicillata. The species is named after American philanthropist James N. Sowell.

== Description ==
Carollia sowelli is slightly larger than C. brevicauda but smaller than C. perspicillata. It has long dorsal fur similar in color to C. brevicauda but lacking the dark brown tips that would make its medial light band conspicuous. Thus the overall appearance is lighter than C. brevicauda. It has a broad, dark band of fur on the nape of the neck, contrasting strongly with a broad whitish band distal to it. This is similar to C. brevicauda, but distinct from C. perspicillata.
