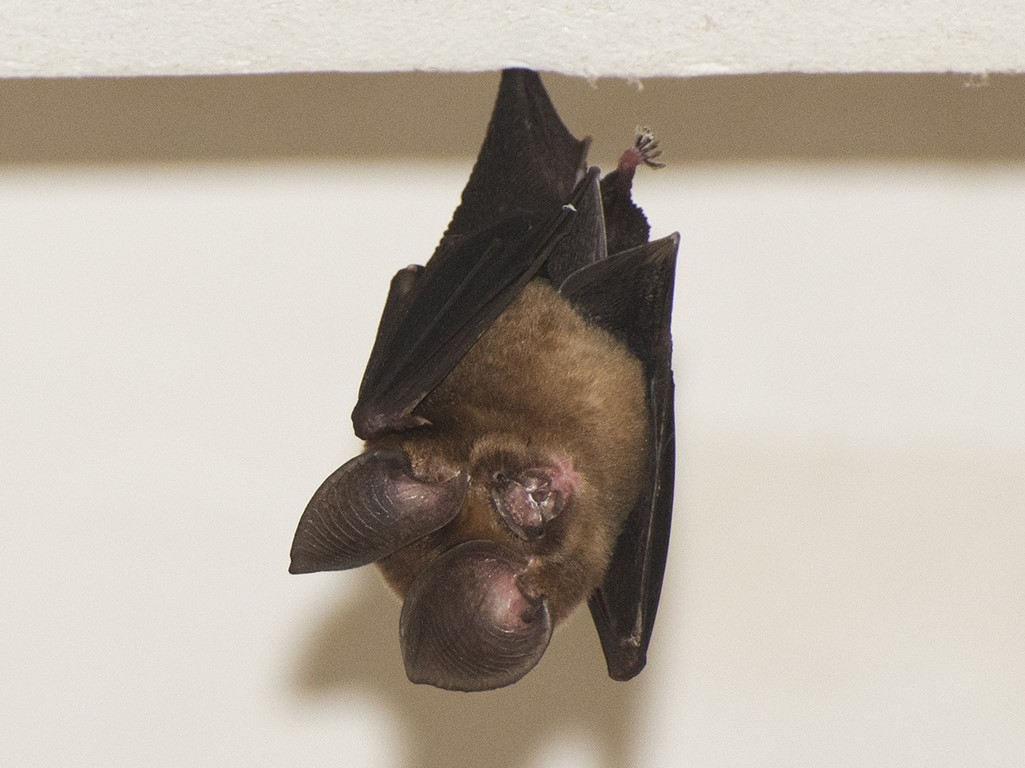

Conservation status
- Vulnerable (IUCN 3.1)

Scientific classification
- Kingdom: Animalia
- Phylum: Chordata
- Class: Mammalia
- Order: Chiroptera
- Family: Hipposideridae
- Genus: Hipposideros
- Species: H. khaokhouayensis

Binomial name
- Hipposideros khaokhouayensis Guillén-Servent & Francis, 2006
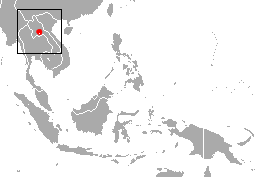
- Range of the Phou Khao Khouay leaf-nosed bat

= Phou Khao Khouay leaf-nosed bat =

Species of bat

The Phou Khao Khouay leaf-nosed bat (Hipposideros khaokhouayensis) is a species of bat found in Laos and Vietnam. It was described as a new species in 2006. It is considered vulnerable to extinction by the IUCN.

== Taxonomy and etymology ==
The Phou Khao Khouay leaf-nosed bat was described as a new species in 2006, based on specimens collected in central Laos in 1997 and 1998. The authors of the 2006 paper placed it in the bicolor species group of the genus Hipposideros. Its species name "khaokhouayensis" is a Neo-Latin derivative of Phou Khao Khouay, the conservation area where this species was discovered. The authors selected this name "to bring attention to the potential importance of the National Biodiversity Conservation Areas network for preserving natural areas in Lao PDR, as they contain highly distinctive ecosystems, hosting many endemic species such as this one." Its closest relative is the Laotian roundleaf bat; the two species have a genetic distance of 3.91–4.12%.

== Description ==
When it was first encountered, researchers thought that it was the Laotian roundleaf bat, Hipposideros rotalis, as the two species are similar in appearance. The bats they found, however, were echolocating at a frequency 20 kHz above that of H. rotalis, utilizing frequencies of 87–91 kHz. In addition to its echolocation, the Phou Khao Khouay leaf-nosed bat has a smaller nose-leaf than H. rotalis. Its forearm is 45.5–48.5 mm (1.79–1.91 in) long; its tail is 35–37.5 mm (1.38–1.48 in) long; its ear is 24.4–25.2 mm (0.96–0.99 in) long. It weighs 7.7–9.6 g (0.27–0.34 oz), making it a moderate-sized species of the bicolor species group. The fur on its back is long and brown; individual hairs are tricolored, with white bases, dark brown middles, and light brown tips. Fur on its belly is lighter in color than the fur on its back. Its ears are long and broad with blunt tips; they are brown in color.

== Biology ==
Not much is known about its biology or reproduction. While females have been encountered in February, May, and June, no pregnant females have been observed. One female captured in May and another captured in June were lactating, though. This species has a pair of pubic nipples in addition to its pair of thoracic nipples, a feature found in all species of the following families: Craseonycteridae, Rhinopomatidae, Megadermatidae, Rhinolophidae, and Hipposideridae. The function of the pubic nipples could be to allow the pups to cling more securely to their mothers before they are able to fly. Pubic nipples could also function in feeding the pup.

== Range and habitat ==
This species was first discovered in Phou Khao Khouay National Biodiversity Conservation Area. It has been captured at elevations ranging from 180–400 m (590–1,310 ft) above sea level. It has also been found near Vang Vieng, also in central Laos. It has been documented in both disturbed and intact evergreen forests. In 2008, the species was also captured in the mangrove habitat of Cat Ba Biosphere Reserve in Vietnam.

== Conservation ==
It is currently evaluated as vulnerable by the IUCN. It meets the criteria for this designation because its extent of occurrence is likely less than 20,000 km^{2} (7,700 mi^{2}), it has been documented in only two locations, and its habitat is experiencing a decline in extent and quality. Even though it occurs in a protected conservation area in Laos, its habitat is still threatened due to lax enforcement of conservation laws. Phou Khao Khouay habitat is threatened by deforestation and the construction of roads and buildings.
