= Fischer's little fruit bat =

Conservation status
- Least Concern (IUCN 3.1)

Scientific classification
- Kingdom: Animalia
- Phylum: Chordata
- Class: Mammalia
- Order: Chiroptera
- Family: Phyllostomidae
- Genus: Rhinophylla
- Species: R. fischerae

Binomial name
- Rhinophylla fischerae Carter, 1966
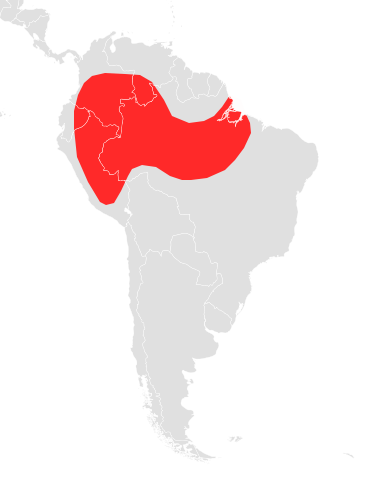

Species of bat

Fischer's little fruit bat (Rhinophylla fischerae) is a bat species found in Brazil, Colombia, Ecuador, Peru and Venezuela.
