= Mono's short-tailed bat =

Conservation status
- Data Deficient (IUCN 3.1)

Scientific classification
- Domain: Eukaryota
- Kingdom: Animalia
- Phylum: Chordata
- Class: Mammalia
- Order: Chiroptera
- Family: Phyllostomidae
- Genus: Carollia
- Species: C. monohernandezi

Binomial name
- Carollia monohernandezi Muñoz, Cuartas & González, 2004

Species of bat

Mono's short-tailed bat (Carollia monohernandezi) is a leaf-nosed bat species found in Colombia and Panama. Specimens have been collected in habitats ranging from dry to tropical rain forest at elevations ranging from 30 to 2,660 metres (98 to 8,727 ft).
