= Patton's long-tongued bat =

Conservation status
- Data Deficient (IUCN 3.1)

Scientific classification
- Kingdom: Animalia
- Phylum: Chordata
- Class: Mammalia
- Order: Chiroptera
- Family: Phyllostomidae
- Genus: Hsunycteris
- Species: H. pattoni

Binomial name
- Hsunycteris pattoni (Woodman & Timm, 2006)

Species of bat

Patton's long-tongued bat (Hsunycteris pattoni) is a bat species from Bolivia, Colombia, Ecuador, and Peru. It was originally described in the genus Lonchophylla, but was moved to Hsunycteris when the latter was erected in 2014.
