= Chiewkwee's horseshoe bat =

Conservation status
- Data Deficient (IUCN 3.1)

Scientific classification
- Kingdom: Animalia
- Phylum: Chordata
- Class: Mammalia
- Order: Chiroptera
- Family: Rhinolophidae
- Genus: Rhinolophus
- Species: R. chiewkweeae

Binomial name
- Rhinolophus chiewkweeae Yoshiyuki & Lim, 2005

Species of bat

Chiewkwee's horseshoe bat (Rhinolophus chiewkweeae) is a species of horseshoe bat endemic to the Malay Peninsula.
