= Hairy little fruit bat =

Conservation status
- Near Threatened (IUCN 3.1)

Scientific classification
- Kingdom: Animalia
- Phylum: Chordata
- Class: Mammalia
- Order: Chiroptera
- Family: Phyllostomidae
- Genus: Rhinophylla
- Species: R. alethina

Binomial name
- Rhinophylla alethina Handley, 1966
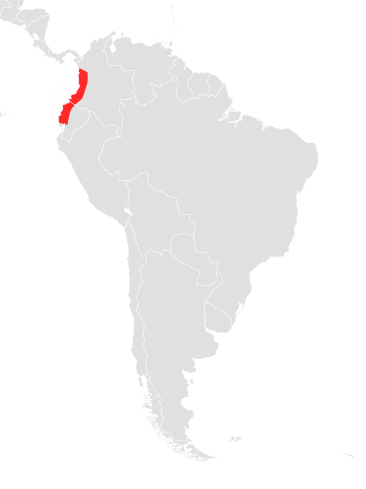

Species of bat

The hairy little fruit bat (Rhinophylla alethina) is a species of bat in the family Phyllostomidae found in Colombia and Ecuador. They are nocturnal creatures. They are listed as near-threatened by the IUCN.
