= Manu short-tailed bat =

Conservation status
- Least Concern (IUCN 3.1)

Scientific classification
- Kingdom: Animalia
- Phylum: Chordata
- Class: Mammalia
- Order: Chiroptera
- Family: Phyllostomidae
- Genus: Carollia
- Species: C. manu

Binomial name
- Carollia manu Pacheco, Solari & Velazco, 2004
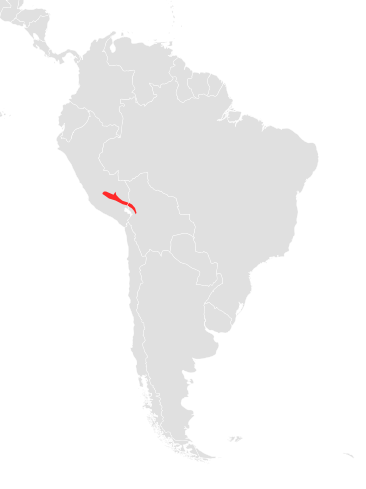
- Manu short-tailed bat range

Species of bat

The Manu short-tailed bat (Carollia manu) is a bat species found in Peru and Bolivia.
