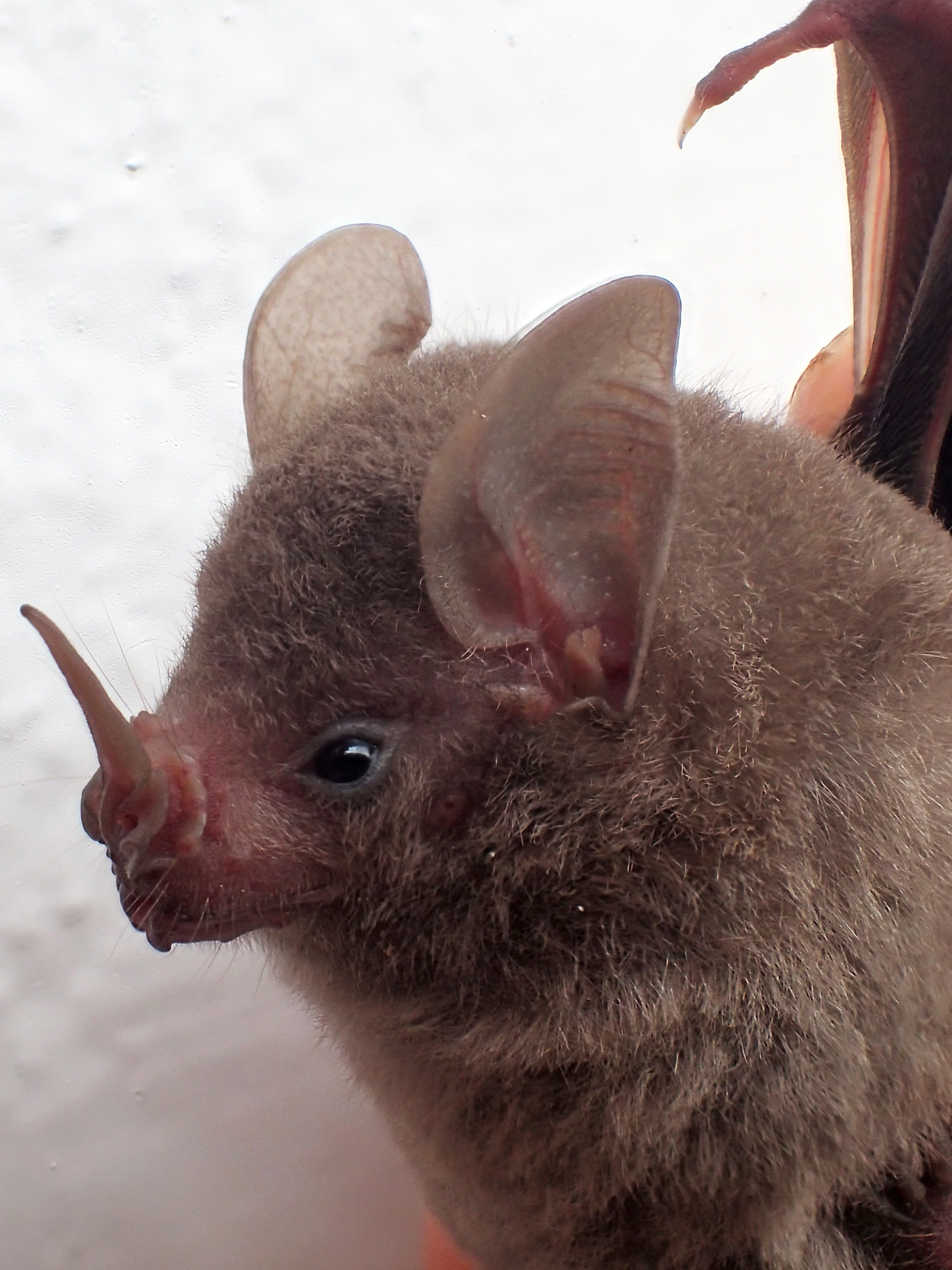
- Dwarf little fruit bat (Rhinophylla pumilio)

Scientific classification
- Domain: Eukaryota
- Kingdom: Animalia
- Phylum: Chordata
- Class: Mammalia
- Order: Chiroptera
- Family: Phyllostomidae
- Subfamily: Rhinophyllinae
- Genus: Rhinophylla; Peters, 1865

Type species
- Rhinophylla pumilio Peters, 1865

Species
- R. alethina R. fischerae R. pumilio

= Rhinophylla =

Genus of bats

Rhinophylla is a genus of South American bats in the family Phyllostomidae containing these species:

- Hairy little fruit bat, R. alethina
- Fischer's little fruit bat, R. fischerae
- Dwarf little fruit bat, R. pumilio
