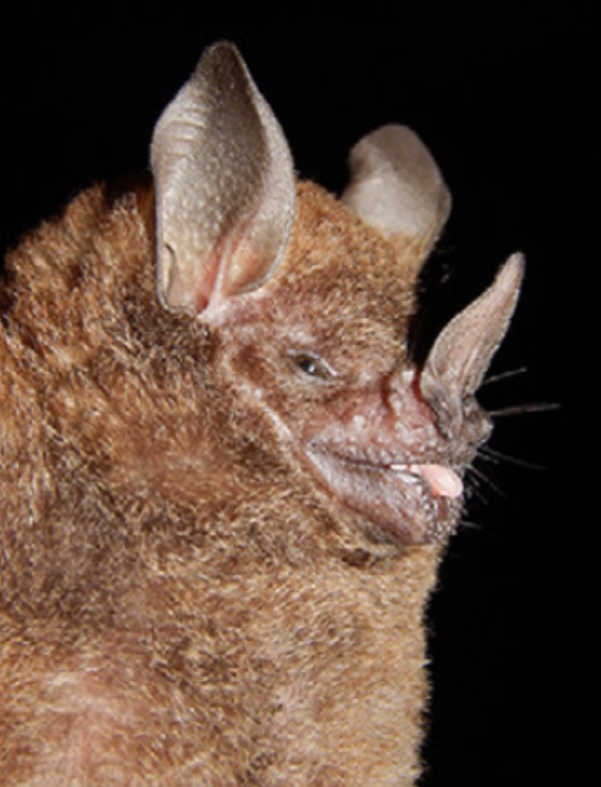
- Photograph of a live specimen of Carollia benkeithi

Conservation status
- Least Concern (IUCN 3.1)

Scientific classification
- Kingdom: Animalia
- Phylum: Chordata
- Class: Mammalia
- Order: Chiroptera
- Family: Phyllostomidae
- Genus: Carollia
- Species: C. benkeithi

Binomial name
- Carollia benkeithi Solari & Baker, 2006
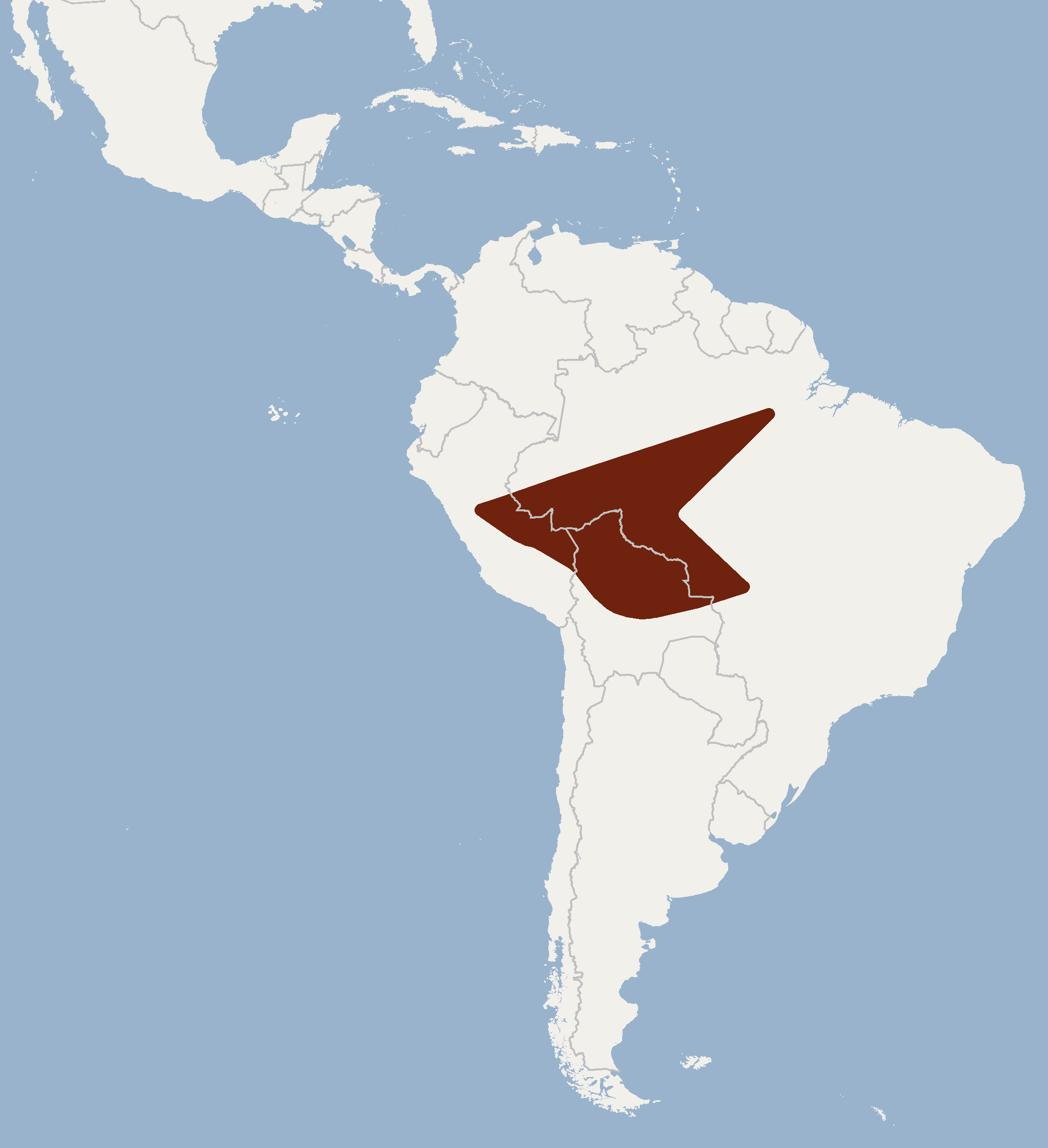

= Benkeith's short-tailed bat =

Species of bat

Benkeith's short-tailed bat (Carollia benkeithi) is a leaf-nosed bat species found in Peru, Bolivia, and Brazil. It very closely resembles the chestnut short-tailed bat, and the two species are likely often confused.

== Taxonomy and etymology ==
Benkeith's short-tailed bat was described as a new species in 2006. The holotype had been collected in 1983, 2 km (1.2 mi) to the south of Tingo María, Peru. The eponym for the species name "benkeithi" was Ben E. Keith, who donated $5 million to Texas Tech University.

== Description ==
Benkeith's short-tailed bat is a relatively small species of short-tailed fruit bat. It has a forearm length of 33.7–37.2 mm (1.33–1.46 in) and a head and body length of 52–68 mm (2.0–2.7 in). The fur on its back is chestnut brown, while its belly fur is a dull, grayish-brown.

== Biology and ecology ==
Based on stable isotope analysis, it likely consumes a considerable amount of insects in addition to plant material such as fruit.

== Range and habitat ==
Benkeith's short-tailed bat is found in northeastern Bolivia, eastern Peru, and western Brazil. In Brazil, it is uncommon within the central Amazon basin.
