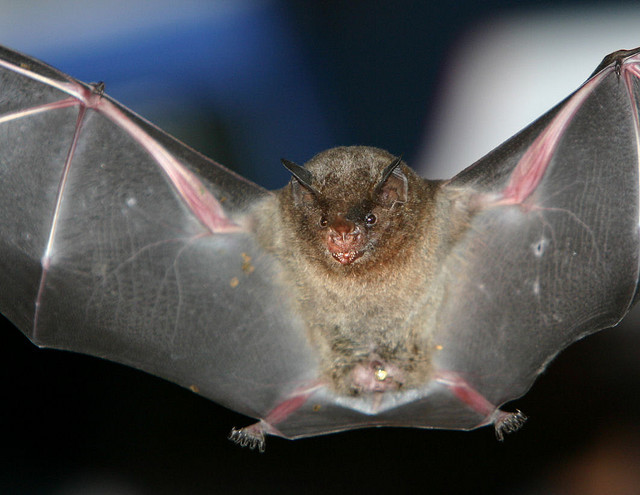

Conservation status
- Least Concern (IUCN 3.1)

Scientific classification
- Kingdom: Animalia
- Phylum: Chordata
- Class: Mammalia
- Order: Chiroptera
- Family: Phyllostomidae
- Genus: Carollia
- Species: C. brevicauda

Binomial name
- Carollia brevicauda Wied-Neuwied, 1821
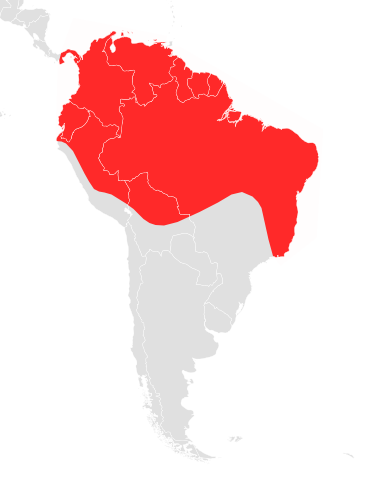
- Silky short-tailed bat range

= Silky short-tailed bat =

Species of bat

The silky short-tailed bat (Carollia brevicauda) is a bat species found in Bolivia, Brazil, Colombia, Ecuador, French Guiana, Guyana, Panama, Peru, Suriname, Mexico and Venezuela.

Its diet consists primarily of fruits, but opportunistically it will glean leaves for insects, supplemented by nectar in the dry season. It is one of the most important seed dispersers for pipers and small fruits in the area which it resides.
