= List of chiropterans =

Animals in mammal order Chiroptera

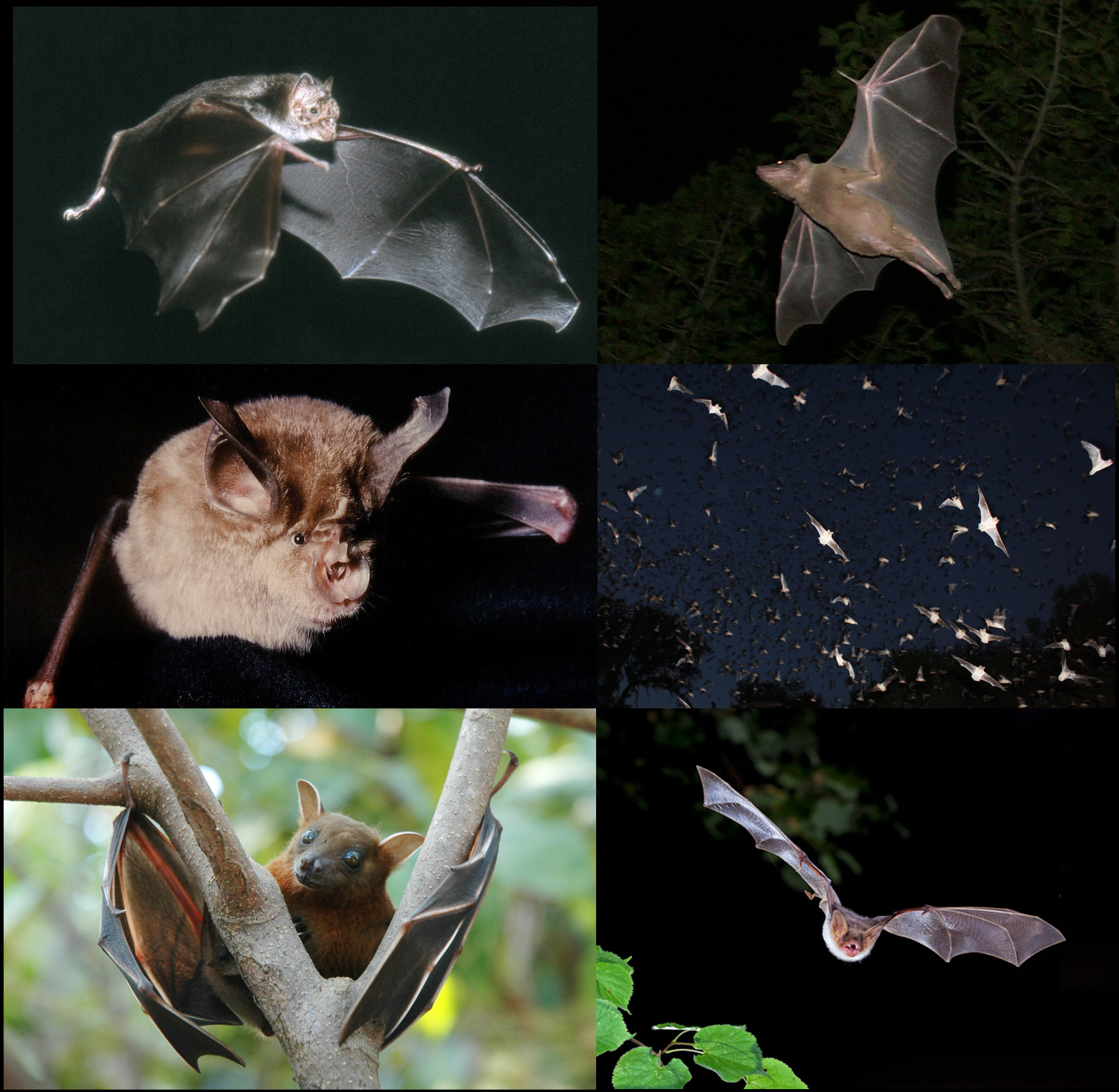
Clockwise from top-right: Egyptian fruit bat (Rousettus aegyptiacus), Mexican free-tailed bat (Tadarida brasiliensis), greater mouse-eared bats (Myotis myotis), greater short-nosed fruit bat (Cynopterus sphinx), greater horseshoe bat (Rhinolophus ferrumequinum), common vampire bat (Desmodus rotundus)

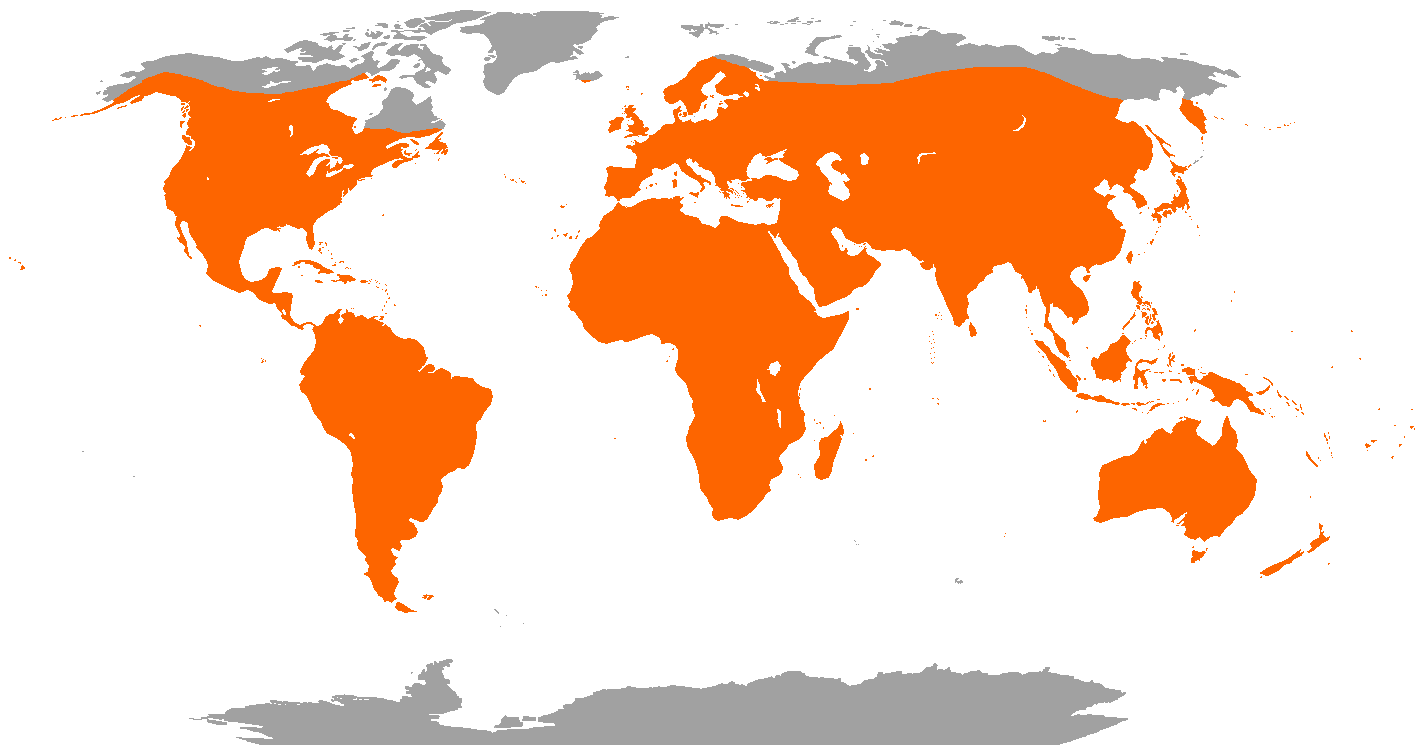
Worldwide distribution of bat species

Chiroptera is an order of flying placental mammals. Members of this order are called chiropterans, or bats. The order comprises 1513 extant species, which are grouped into 237 genera. The second largest order of mammals after rodents, bats comprise about 20% of all mammal species worldwide. The majority of bats live in South and Central America, Africa, and southern and Southeast Asia, but the order can be found in most of the world outside of Antarctica and the arctic. They live in a variety of habitats, particularly forests and caves but also grasslands, savannas, shrublands, wetlands, deserts, and rocky areas. With their forelimbs adapted as wings, they are the only mammals capable of sustained flight. They range in length from Kitti's hog-nosed bat, at 2 cm (1 in), to the great flying fox, at 37 cm (15 in). Bat wings are relatively proportionate to their size, with the large flying fox having the largest overall wingspan, up to 1.7 m (5.6 ft).

Chiroptera is divided into two suborders: Yangochiroptera and Yinpterochiroptera. The suborders are further subdivided into clades and families. Yangochiroptera contains 14 families grouped into three superfamilies: Emballonuroidea, containing the sheath-tailed, sucker-footed, and slit-faced bats; Noctilionoidea, containing the smoky, mustached, short-tailed, bulldog, leaf-nosed, and disk-winged bats; and Vespertilionoidea, consisting of the wing-gland, bent-winged, free-tailed, funnel-eared, and vesper bats. Yinpterochiroptera includes seven families grouped into two superfamilies: Pteropodoidea, consisting of the fruit bats, and Rhinolophoidea, containing the hog-nosed, Old World leaf-nosed, false vampire, horseshoe, trident, and mouse-tailed bats. The exact organization of the species is not fixed, with many recent proposals made based on molecular phylogenetic analysis. Nine species have been recorded as going extinct since 1500 CE.

== Conventions ==
The author citation for the species or genus is given after the scientific name; parentheses around the author citation indicate that this was not the original taxonomic placement. Range maps are provided wherever possible; if a range map is not available, a description of the collective range of species in that genera is provided. Ranges are based on the International Union for Conservation of Nature (IUCN) Red List of Threatened Species unless otherwise noted. All extinct genera or species listed alongside extant species went extinct after 1500 CE, and are indicated by a dagger symbol "†".

== Classification ==
The order Chiroptera consists of 1513 extant species belonging to 237 genera. This does not include hybrid species or extinct prehistoric species. Modern molecular studies indicate that the 237 genera can be grouped into 21 families; these families are divided between two named suborders and are grouped in those suborders into named clades, and some of these families are subdivided into named subfamilies. An additional nine species have been recorded as going extinct since 1500 CE: three in the family Vespertilionidae, and six in the family Pteropodidae.

Suborder Yangochiroptera

- Superfamily Emballonuroidea
  - Family Emballonuridae (sheath-tailed bats)
    - Subfamily Emballonurinae (sheath-tailed, sac-winged, and ghost bats): 12 genera, 37 species
    - Subfamily Taphozoinae (pouched and tomb bats): 2 genera, 18 species
  - Family Myzopodidae (sucker-footed bats): 1 genus, 2 species
  - Family Nycteridae (slit-faced bats): 1 genus, 14 species
- Superfamily Noctilionoidea
  - Family Furipteridae (smoky and thumbless bats): 2 genera, 2 species
  - Family Mormoopidae (ghost-faced, naked-backed, and mustached bats): 2 genera, 18 species
  - Family Mystacinidae (New Zealand short-tailed bats): 1 genus, 2 species
  - Family Noctilionidae (bulldog bats): 1 genus, 2 species
  - Family Phyllostomidae (leaf-nosed bats)
    - Subfamily Carolliinae (short-tailed bats): 1 genus, 8 species
    - Subfamily Desmodontinae (vampire bats): 3 genera, 2 species
    - Subfamily Glossophaginae (long-tongued bats): 16 genera, 43 species
    - Subfamily Glyphonycterinae (big-eared bats): 3 genera, 5 species
    - Subfamily Lonchophyllinae (nectar bats): 3 genera, 18 species
    - Subfamily Lonchorhininae (sword-nosed bats): 1 genus, 6 species
    - Subfamily Macrotinae (leaf-nosed bats): 1 genus, 2 species
    - Subfamily Micronycterinae (big-eared bats): 2 genera, 14 species
    - Subfamily Phyllostominae (round-eared and spear-nosed bats): 10 genera, 28 species
    - Subfamily Rhinophyllinae (little fruit bats): 1 genus, 3 species
    - Subfamily Stenodermatinae (yellow-shouldered and neotropical fruit bats): 20 genera, 103 species
  - Family Thyropteridae (disk-winged bats): 1 genus, 5 species
- Superfamily Vespertilionoidea
  - Family Cistugidae (wing-gland bats): 1 genus, 2 species
  - Family Miniopteridae (bent-winged and long-fingered bats): 1 genus, 41 species
  - Family Molossidae (free-tailed bats)
    - Subfamily Molossinae (free-tailed bats): 21 genera, 132 species
    - Subfamily Tomopeatinae (blunt-eared bat): 1 genus, 1 species
  - Family Natalidae (funnel-eared bats): 3 genera, 11 species
  - Family Vespertilionidae (vesper bats)
    - Subfamily Kerivoulinae (woolly bats): 2 genera, 32 species
    - Subfamily Murininae (tube-nosed bats): 3 genera, 56 species
    - Subfamily Myotinae (mouse-eared bats): 3 genera, 147 species
    - Subfamily Vespertilioninae (pipistrelles and serotines): 53 genera, 327 species (3 extinct)

Suborder Yinpterochiroptera

- Superfamily Pteropodoidea
  - Family Pteropodidae (fruit bats)
    - Subfamily Cynopterinae (short-nosed and tailless fruit bats): 15 genera, 31 species
    - Subfamily Eidolinae (palm bats): 1 genera, 2 species
    - Subfamily Harpyionycterinae (naked-backed fruit bats): 4 genera, 18 species
    - Subfamily Nyctimeninae (tube-nosed fruit bats): 2 genera, 18 species
    - Subfamily Pteropodinae (flying foxes): 7 genera, 82 species (6 extinct)
    - Subfamily Rousettinae (rousettes and epauletted fruit bats): 13 genera, 41 species
    - Subfamily Macroglossusinae (blossom bats): 5 genera, 12 species
- Superfamily Rhinolophoidea
  - Family Craseonycteridae (Kitti's hog-nosed bat): 1 genus, 1 species
  - Family Hipposideridae (Old World leaf-nosed bats): 7 genera, 94 species
  - Family Megadermatidae (false vampire bats): 6 genera, 7 species
  - Family Rhinolophidae (horseshoe bats): 1 genus, 92 species
  - Family Rhinonycteridae (trident bats): 4 genera, 9 species
  - Family Rhinopomatidae (mouse-tailed bats): 1 genus, 6 species

- Chiroptera
  - Yangochiroptera
    - - Emballonuroidea
        - Myzopodidae
        - - Emballonuridae
          - Nycteridae
    - - Noctilionoidea
        - Mystacinidae
        - - - Mormoopidae
            - Phyllostomidae
          - - - Furipteridae
              - Noctilionidae
            - Thyropteridae
      - Vespertilionoidea
        - Natalidae
        - - Molossidae
          - - Miniopteridae
            - - Cistugidae
              - Vespertilionidae
  - Yinpterochiroptera
    - Pteropodoidea
      Pteropodidae
    - Rhinolophoidea
      - - Hipposideridae
        - - Rhinolophidae
          - Rhinonycteridae
      - - - Craseonycteridae
          - Megadermatidae
        - Rhinopomatidae

=== Fossil genera ===
The following basal fossil bat genera of uncertain taxonomic placement are also known from the Paleogene. A few are known from well-preserved complete skeletons, but the majority are known only from fragmentary cranial and dental elements. In some cases, they are placed in their own extinct families (Palaeochiropterygidae, Archaeonycteridae), but some recent studies suggest that these divisions are paraphyletic.

- Aegyptonycteris
- Ageina
- Altaynycteris
- Archaeonycteris
- Archaeopteropus
- Australonycteris
- Cambaya
- Carcinipteryx
- Chambinycteris
- Cryptobune
- Dizzya
- Eppsinycteris
- Hassianycteris
- Honrovits
- Icaronycteris
- Jaegeria
- Khonsunycteris
- Khoufechia
- Lapichiropteryx
- Marnenycteris
- Microchiropteryx (potentially a vespertilionoid)
- Mixopteryx
- Necromantis
- Onychonycteris
- Palaeochiropteryx
- Palaeophyllophora
- Philisis
- Premonycteris
- Protonycteris
- Protorhinolophus
- Pseudorhinolophus (potentially in Hipposideros)
- Pseudovespertiliavus
- Sonor (potentially a vespertilionid)
- Tanzanycteris
- Vaylatsia
- Vespertiliavus
- Vielasia
- Volactrix
- Witwatia
- Xylonycteris

== Chiropterans ==
The following classification is based on the taxonomy described by the reference work Mammal Species of the World (2005), with augmentation by generally accepted proposals made since using molecular phylogenetic analysis, as supported by both the IUCN SSC Bat Specialist Group and the American Society of Mammalogists.

=== Suborder Yangochiroptera ===
==== Superfamily Emballonuroidea ====
===== Family Emballonuridae =====
Members of the Emballonuridae family are called emballonurids, and include sheath-tailed bats, sac-winged bats, ghost bats, pouched bats, and tomb bats. They are all insectivorous and eat a variety of insects and spiders, and occasionally fruit. Emballonuridae comprises 55 extant species, divided into 14 genera. These genera are grouped into two subfamilies: Emballonurinae, containing sheath-tailed, sac-winged, ghost, and other bat species, and Taphozoinae, containing pouched and tomb bats.

Subfamily Emballonurinae – Gervais, 1856 – 12 genera
| Name | Authority and species | Range | Size and ecology |
|---|---|---|---|
| Balantiopteryx (sac-winged bat) | Peters, 1867 Three species: B. infusca (Ecuadorian sac-winged bat); B. io (Thomas's sac-winged bat); B. plicata (Gray sac-winged bat, pictured) | Mexico, Central America, and northwestern South America | Size range: 3 cm (1 in) long, plus 1 cm (0.4 in) tail (Ecuadorian sac-winged bat) to 6 cm (2 in) long, plus 3 cm (1 in) tail (gray sac-winged bat) Habitats: Caves, shrubland, and forest |
| Centronycteris (shaggy bat) | J. E. Gray, 1838 Two species: C. centralis (Thomas's shaggy bat, pictured); C. maximiliani (Shaggy bat) | Mexico, Central America, and northern and eastern South America | Size range: 4 cm (2 in) long, plus 1 cm (0.4 in) tail (Thomas's shaggy bat) to 7 cm (3 in) long, plus 3 cm (1 in) tail (shaggy bat) Habitat: Forest |
| Coleura (sheath-tailed bat) | Peters, 1867 Four species: C. afra (African sheath-tailed bat, pictured); C. gallarum (Somali sheath-tailed bat); C. kibomalandy (Madagascar sheath-tailed bat); C. seychellensis (Seychelles sheath-tailed bat) | Africa | Size range: 5–7 cm (2–3 in) long, plus 1–2 cm (0.4–0.8 in) tail (multiple) Habitats: Shrubland, forest, caves, savanna, inland wetlands, and desert |
| Cormura | Peters, 1867 One species: C. brevirostris (Chestnut sac-winged bat) | Central America and northern South America | Size: 4–6 cm (2–2 in) long, plus 1–2 cm (0.4–0.8 in) tail Habitat: Forest |
| Cyttarops | Thomas, 1913 One species: C. alecto (Short-eared bat) | Central America and northern South America | Size: 4–6 cm (2–2 in) long, plus 2–3 cm (1–1 in) tail Habitat: Forest |
| Diclidurus (ghost bat) | Wied-Neuwied, 1820 Four species: D. albus (Northern ghost bat, pictured); D. ingens (Greater ghost bat); D. isabellus (Isabelle's ghost bat); D. scutatus (Lesser ghost bat) | Mexico, Central America, and South America | Size range: 5 cm (2 in) long, plus 1 cm (0.4 in) tail (lesser ghost bat) to 9 cm (4 in) long, plus 8 cm (3 in) tail (northern ghost bat) Habitat: Forest |
| Emballonura (sheath-tailed bat) | Temminck, 1838 Eight species: E. alecto (Small Asian sheath-tailed bat); E. beccarii (Beccari's sheath-tailed bat); E. dianae (Large-eared sheath-tailed bat); E. furax (Greater sheath-tailed bat); E. monticola (Lesser sheath-tailed bat); E. raffrayana (Raffray's sheath-tailed bat); E. semicaudata (Pacific sheath-tailed bat, pictured); E. serii (Seri's sheath-tailed bat) | Southeastern Asia | Size range: 3 cm (1 in) long, plus 1 cm (0.4 in) tail (Beccari's sheath-tailed bat) to 7 cm (3 in) long, plus 2 cm (1 in) tail (greater sheath-tailed bat) Habitats: Rocky areas, caves, and forest |
| Mosia | J. E. Gray, 1843 One species: M. nigrescens (Dark sheath-tailed bat) | Indonesia, Papua New Guinea, and the Solomon Islands | Size: 3–5 cm (1–2 in) long, plus 1–2 cm (0.4–0.8 in) tail Habitats: Forest, rocky areas, and caves |
| Paremballonura (false sheath-tailed bat) | Goodman, Puechmaille, Friedli-Weyeneth, Gerlach, Ruedi, Schoeman, Stanley, & Teeling, 2012 Two species: P. atrata (Peters's sheath-tailed bat); P. tiavato (Western sheath-tailed bat) | Madagascar | Size range: 4–5 cm (2 in), plus 1–2 cm (0.4–0.8 in) tail (multiple) Habitats: Caves and forest |
| Peropteryx (dog-like bat) | Peters, 1867 Five species: P. kappleri (Greater dog-like bat); P. leucoptera (White-winged dog-like bat); P. macrotis (Lesser dog-like bat, pictured); P. pallidoptera (Pale-winged dog-like bat); P. trinitatis (Trinidad dog-like bat) | Mexico, Central America, and South America | Size range: 4 cm (2 in) long, plus 1 cm (0.4 in) tail (lesser dog-like bat) to 8 cm (3 in) long, plus 2 cm (1 in) tail (greater dog-like bat) Habitats: Caves, shrubland, and forest |
| Rhynchonycteris | Peters, 1867 One species: R. naso (Proboscis bat) | Mexico, Central America, and South America | Size: 3–5 cm (1–2 in) long, plus 1–2 cm (0.4–0.8 in) tail Habitats: Forest and caves |
| Saccopteryx (sac-winged bat) | Illiger, 1811 Five species: S. antioquensis (Antioquian sac-winged bat); S. bilineata (Greater sac-winged bat); S. canescens (Frosted sac-winged bat, pictured); S. gymnura (Amazonian sac-winged bat); S. leptura (Lesser sac-winged bat) | Mexico, Central America, and South America | Size range: 3 cm (1 in) long, plus 1 cm (0.4 in) tail (Amazonian sac-winged bat) to 6 cm (2 in) long, plus 3 cm (1 in) tail (greater sac-winged bat) Habitats: Caves and forest |

Subfamily Taphozoinae – Jerdon, 1867 – two genera
| Name | Authority and species | Range | Size and ecology |
|---|---|---|---|
| Saccolaimus (pouched bat) | Temminck, 1838 Four species: S. flaviventris (Yellow-bellied sheath-tailed bat, pictured); S. mixtus (Papuan sheath-tailed bat); S. peli (Pel's pouched bat); S. saccolaimus (Naked-rumped pouched bat) | Southern and southeastern Asia, Australia, and western and central Africa | Size range: 7 cm (3 in) long, plus 2 cm (1 in) tail (Papuan sheath-tailed bat) to 14 cm (6 in) long, plus 4 cm (2 in) tail (Pel's pouched bat) Habitats: Savanna, caves, shrubland, and forest |
| Taphozous (tomb bat) | Geoffroy, 1818 14 species: T. achates (Indonesian tomb bat); T. australis (Coastal sheath-tailed bat, pictured); T. georgianus (Common sheath-tailed bat); T. hamiltoni (Hamilton's tomb bat); T. hildegardeae (Hildegarde's tomb bat); T. hilli (Hill's sheath-tailed bat); T. kapalgensis (Arnhem sheath-tailed bat); T. longimanus (Long-winged tomb bat); T. mauritianus (Mauritian tomb bat); T. melanopogon (Black-bearded tomb bat); T. nudiventris (Naked-rumped tomb bat); T. perforatus (Egyptian tomb bat); T. theobaldi (Theobald's tomb bat); T. troughtoni (Troughton's sheath-tailed bat) | Southern and southeastern Asia, Australia, and Africa | Size range: 6 cm (2 in) long, plus 1 cm (0.4 in) tail (black-bearded tomb bat) to 11 cm (4 in) long, plus 5 cm (2 in) tail (naked-rumped tomb bat) Habitats: Shrubland, forest, grassland, coastal marine, rocky areas, savanna, caves, inland wetlands, and desert (some species unknown) |

===== Family Myzopodidae =====
Members of the Myzopodidae family are called myzopodids, or colloquially sucker-footed bats, and include two extant species in a single genus. They are both insectivorous.

Not assigned to a named subfamily – one genus
| Name | Authority and species | Range | Size and ecology |
|---|---|---|---|
| Myzopoda (sucker-footed bat) | Milne-Edwards & A. Grandidier, 1878 Two species: M. aurita (Madagascar sucker-footed bat, pictured); M. schliemanni (Western sucker-footed bat) | Madagascar | Size range: 4 cm (2 in) long, plus 4 cm (2 in) tail (western sucker-footed bat) to 7 cm (3 in) long, plus 6 cm (2 in) tail (Madagascar sucker-footed bat) Habitats: Forest, inland wetlands, and caves |

===== Family Nycteridae =====
Members of the Nycteridae family are called nycterids, or colloquially slit-faced bats. Nycteridae comprises fourteen extant species in a single genus. They are all insectivorous, though the large slit-faced bat also regularly eats fish, frogs, birds, and bats.

Not assigned to a named subfamily – one genus
| Name | Authority and species | Range | Size and ecology |
|---|---|---|---|
| Nycteris (slit-faced bat) | Geoffroy & Cuvier, 1795 14 species: N. arge (Bates's slit-faced bat); N. aurita (Andersen's slit-faced bat); N. gambiensis (Gambian slit-faced bat); N. grandis (Large slit-faced bat); N. hispida (Hairy slit-faced bat, pictured); N. intermedia (Intermediate slit-faced bat); N. javanica (Javan slit-faced bat); N. macrotis (Large-eared slit-faced bat); N. major (Ja slit-faced bat); N. nana (Dwarf slit-faced bat); N. parisii (Parissi's slit-faced bat); N. thebaica (Egyptian slit-faced bat); N. tragata (Malayan slit-faced bat); N. woodi (Wood's slit-faced bat) | Africa, western Arabian Peninsula, and southeastern Asia | Size range: 3 cm (1 in) long, plus 3 cm (1 in) tail (dwarf slit-faced bat) to 9 cm (4 in) long, plus 9 cm (4 in) tail (large slit-faced bat) Habitats: Shrubland, forest, grassland, rocky areas, savanna, caves, and desert |

==== Superfamily Noctilionoidea ====
===== Family Furipteridae =====
Members of the Furipteridae family are called furipterids, and include two extant species, each in their own genus. They are both insectivorous.

Not assigned to a named subfamily – two genera
| Name | Authority and species | Range | Size and ecology |
|---|---|---|---|
| Amorphochilus | Peters, 1877 One species: A. schnablii (Smoky bat) | Western South America | Size range: 3–5 cm (1–2 in) long, plus 2–4 cm (1–2 in) tail Habitat: Forest |
| Furipterus | Bonaparte, 1837 One species: F. horrens (Thumbless bat) | Central America and South America | Size range: 3–5 cm (1–2 in) long, plus 2–4 cm (1–2 in) tail Habitats: Forest and caves |

===== Family Mormoopidae =====
Members of the Mormoopidae family are called mormoopids, and include ghost-faced bats, naked-backed bats, and mustached bats. Mormoopidae comprises 18 extant species, divided into two genera. They are all insectivorous.

Not assigned to a named subfamily – two genera
| Name | Authority and species | Range | Size and ecology |
|---|---|---|---|
| Mormoops (ghost-faced bat) | Leach, 1821 Two species: M. blainvillei (Antillean ghost-faced bat, pictured); M. megalophylla (Ghost-faced bat) | Southern North America, Caribbean, Central America, and northern South America (in red) | Size range: 5 cm (2 in) long, plus 2 cm (1 in) tail (Antillean ghost-faced bat) to 8 cm (3 in) long, plus 4 cm (2 in) tail (ghost-faced bat) Habitats: Caves and forest |
| Pteronotus (mustached bat) | J. E. Gray, 1838 Sixteen species: P. alitonus (Clarion mustached bat); P. davyi (Davy's naked-backed bat); P. fulvus (Tawny naked-backed bat); P. fuscus (Dusky mustached bat); P. gymnonotus (Big naked-backed bat); P. macleayii (Macleay's mustached bat); P. mesoamericanus (Mesoamerican common mustached bat); P. mexicanus (Mexican mustached bat); P. paraguanensis (Paraguana moustached bat); P. parnellii (Parnell's mustached bat); P. personatus (Wagner's mustached bat, pictured); P. portoricensis (Puerto Rican mustached bat); P. psilotis (Tehuantepec mustached bat); P. pusillus (Tiny mustached bat); P. quadridens (Sooty mustached bat); P. rubiginosus (Wagner's common mustached bat) | Mexico, Caribbean, Central America, and northern and central South America (in blue) | Size range: 4 cm (2 in) long, plus 2 cm (1 in) tail (Macleay's mustached bat) to 8 cm (3 in) long, plus 3 cm (1 in) tail (Mesoamerican common mustached bat) Habitats: Savanna, caves, and forest |

===== Family Mystacinidae =====
Members of the Mystacinidae family are called mystacinids, or colloquially New Zealand short-tailed bats, and include two extant species in a single genus. They are both omnivorous, eating insects, fruit, carrion, pollen, and nectar.

Not assigned to a named subfamily – one genus
| Name | Authority and species | Range | Size and ecology |
|---|---|---|---|
| Mystacina (New Zealand short-tailed bat) | J. E. Gray, 1843 Two species: M. robusta (New Zealand greater short-tailed bat); M. tuberculata (New Zealand lesser short-tailed bat, pictured) | New Zealand | Size range: 6 cm (2 in) long, plus 0.5 cm (0.2 in) tail (New Zealand lesser short-tailed bat) to 9 cm (4 in) long, plus 2 cm (1 in) tail (New Zealand greater short-tailed bat) Habitat: Forest |

===== Family Noctilionidae =====
Members of the Noctilionidae family are called noctilionids, or colloquially bulldog bats, and include two extant species in a single genus. They are both insectivorous, but the greater bulldog bat primarily eats fish.

Not assigned to a named subfamily – one genus
| Name | Authority and species | Range | Size and ecology |
|---|---|---|---|
| Noctilio (bulldog bat) | Linnaeus, 1766 Two species: N. albiventris (Lesser bulldog bat, pictured); N. leporinus (Greater bulldog bat) | Mexico, Caribbean, Central America, and South America | Size range: 6 cm (2 in) long, plus 1 cm (0.4 in) tail (lesser bulldog bat) to 10 cm (4 in) long, plus 3 cm (1 in) tail (greater bulldog bat) Habitats: Forest, savanna, shrubland, and caves |

===== Family Phyllostomidae =====
Members of the Phyllostomidae family are called phyllostomids, or colloquially leaf-nosed bats, and include vampire bats, long-tongued bats, big-eared bats, broad-nosed bats, and yellow-shouldered bats. They primarily eat a variety of insects, fruit, nectar, and pollen, though a few will also eat birds, bats, and small mammals, and the three vampire bat species of the subfamily Desmodontinae solely consume blood. Phyllostomidae comprises 231 extant species, divided into 61 genera. These genera are grouped into 11 subfamilies: Carolliinae, Desmodontinae, Glossophaginae, Glyphonycterinae, Lonchophyllinae, Lonchorhininae, Macrotinae, Micronycterinae, Phyllostominae, Rhinophyllinae, and Stenodermatinae.

Subfamily Carolliinae – Miller, 1924 – one genus
| Name | Authority and species | Range | Size and ecology |
|---|---|---|---|
| Carollia (short-tailed bat) | J. E. Gray, 1838 Eight species: C. benkeithi (Benkeith's short-tailed bat); C. brevicauda (Silky short-tailed bat, pictured); C. castanea (Chestnut short-tailed bat); C. manu (Manu short-tailed bat); C. monohernandezi (Mono's short-tailed bat); C. perspicillata (Seba's short-tailed bat); C. sowelli (Sowell's short-tailed bat); C. subrufa (Gray short-tailed bat) | Mexico, Central America, and South America | Size range: 4 cm (2 in) long, plus 0.5 cm (0.2 in) tail (chestnut short-tailed bat) to 8 cm (3 in) long, plus 2 cm (1 in) tail (gray short-tailed bat) Habitats: Caves, savanna, and forest (some species unknown) |

Subfamily Desmodontinae – Wagner, 1840 – three genera
| Name | Authority and species | Range | Size and ecology |
|---|---|---|---|
| Desmodus | Wied-Neuwied, 1826 One species: D. rotundus (Common vampire bat) | Mexico, Central America, and South America | Size: 6–10 cm (2–4 in) long, with no tail Habitats: Rocky areas and caves |
| Diaemus | Miller, 1906 One species: D. youngi (White-winged vampire bat) | Mexico, Central America, and northern South America | Size: 8–9 cm (3–4 in) long, with no tail Habitats: Forest and caves |
| Diphylla | Spix, 1823 One species: D. ecaudata (Hairy-legged vampire bat) | Mexico, Central America, and northern South America | Size: 6–10 cm (2–4 in) long, with no tail Habitats: Forest, grassland, and caves |

Subfamily Glossophaginae – Bonaparte, 1845 – 16 genera
| Name | Authority and species | Range | Size and ecology |
|---|---|---|---|
| Anoura (tailless bat) | J. E. Gray, 1838 Ten species: A. aequatoris (Equatorial tailless bat); A. cadenai (Cadena's tailless bat); A. caudifer (Tailed tailless bat); A. cultrata (Handley's tailless bat); A. fistulata (Tube-lipped nectar bat); A. geoffroyi (Geoffroy's tailless bat, pictured); A. javieri (Javier's tailless bat); A. latidens (Broad-toothed tailless bat); A. luismanueli (Luis Manuel's tailless bat); A. peruana (Tschudi's tailless bat) | Mexico, Central America, and South America | Size range: 4 cm (2 in) long, plus 0.5 cm (0.2 in) tail (tailed tailless bat) to 9 cm (4 in) long, with no tail (Tschudi's tailless bat) Habitats: Caves, shrubland, and forest |
| Brachyphylla (fruit-eating bat) | J. E. Gray, 1834 Two species: B. cavernarum (Antillean fruit-eating bat, pictured); B. nana (Cuban fruit-eating bat) | Caribbean | Size range: 7 cm (3 in) long, with no tail (Cuban fruit-eating bat) to 10 cm (4 in) long, with no tail (Antillean fruit-eating bat) Habitats: Caves and forest |
| Choeroniscus (long-tailed bat) | Thomas, 1928 Three species: C. godmani (Godman's long-tailed bat); C. minor (Lesser long-tongued bat); C. periosus (Greater long-tailed bat) | Mexico, Central America, and northern South America | Size range: 5 cm (2 in) long, plus 0.5 cm (0.2 in) tail (Godman's long-tailed bat) to 7 cm (3 in) long, plus 1 cm (0.4 in) tail (greater long-tailed bat) Habitats: Inland wetlands and forest |
| Choeronycteris | Tschudi, 1844 One species: C. mexicana (Mexican long-tongued bat) | Mexico, Central America, and southern United States | Size: 8–11 cm (3–4 in) long, plus 0.5–2 cm (0.2–0.8 in) tail Habitats: Forest, caves, and desert |
| Dryadonycteris | Nogueira, Lima, Peracchi, & Simmons, 2012 One species: D. capixaba (Capixaba nectar-feeding bat) | Eastern Brazil | Size: 5–6 cm (2–2 in) long, plus 0–1 cm (0.0–0.4 in) tail Habitat: Forest |
| Erophylla (flower bat) | Miller, 1906 Two species: E. bombifrons (Brown flower bat); E. sezekorni (Buffy flower bat) | Caribbean | Size range: 6 cm (2 in) long, plus 1 cm (0 in) tail (buffy flower bat) to 9 cm (4 in) long, plus 2 cm (1 in) tail (brown flower bat) Habitat: Caves |
| Glossophaga (long-tongued bat) | Geoffroy, 1818 Nine species: G. antillarum (Jamaican long-tongued bat); G. bakeri (Baker's long-tongued bat); G. commissarisi (Commissaris's long-tongued bat, pictured); G. leachii (Gray long-tongued bat); G. longirostris (Miller's long-tongued bat); G. morenoi (Western long-tongued bat); G. mutica (Tres Marias long-tongued bat); G. soricina (Pallas's long-tongued bat); G. valens (Robust long-tongued bat) | Mexico, Central America, and Southern Mexico | Size range: 4 cm (2 in) long, plus 0.5 cm (0.2 in) tail (Commissaris's long-tongued bat) to 8 cm (3 in) long, plus 2 cm (1 in) tail (Miller's long-tongued bat) Habitats: Caves, shrubland, savanna, and forest |
| Hylonycteris | Thomas, 1903 One species: H. underwoodi (Underwood's long-tongued bat) | Southern Mexico and Central America | Size: 3–6 cm (1–2 in) long, plus 0–1 cm (0.0–0.4 in) tail Habitats: Forest and caves |
| Leptonycteris (long-nosed bat) | Lydekker, 1891 Three species: L. curasoae (Southern long-nosed bat, pictured); L. nivalis (Greater long-nosed bat); L. yerbabuenae (Lesser long-nosed bat) | Mexico, Central America, and northern South America | Size range: 7–9 cm (3–4 in) long, with no tail (multiple) Habitats: Desert, caves, and forest |
| Lichonycteris (little long-tongued bat) | Thomas, 1895 Two species: L. degener (Pale brown long-nosed bat); L. obscura (Dark long-tongued bat, pictured) | Mexico, Central America, and South America | Size range: 4–6 cm (2–2 in) long, plus 0.5–1 cm (0–0 in) tail (multiple) Habitat: Forest |
| Monophyllus (single leaf bat) | Leach, 1821 Two species: M. plethodon (Insular single leaf bat); M. redmani (Leach's single leaf bat, pictured) | Caribbean | Size range: 5 cm (2 in) long, plus 0.5 cm (0.2 in) tail (Leach's single leaf bat) to 9 cm (4 in) long, plus 2 cm (1 in) tail (insular single leaf bat) Habitat: Caves |
| Musonycteris | Schaldach & McLaughlin, 1960 One species: M. harrisoni (Banana bat) | Southern Mexico | Size: 8–9 cm (3–4 in) long, plus 0.5–2 cm (0.2–0.8 in) tail Habitats: Forest and caves |
| Phyllonycteris (flower bats) | Gundlach, 1860 Two species: P. aphylla (Jamaican flower bat); P. poeyi (Cuban flower bat) | Caribbean and Jamaica | Size range: 7 cm (3 in) long, plus 0.5 cm (0.2 in) tail (Jamaican flower bat) to 9 cm (4 in) long, plus 2 cm (1 in) tail (Cuban flower bat) Habitats: Caves and forest |
| Platalina | Thomas, 1928 One species: P. genovensium (Long-snouted bat) | Western South America | Size: 6–8 cm (2–3 in) long, plus 0.5–1 cm (0.2–0.4 in) tail Habitats: Savanna and caves |
| Scleronycteris | Thomas, 1912 One species: S. ega (Ega long-tongued bat) | Northern South America | Size: 5–6 cm (2–2 in) long, plus 0.5–1 cm (0.2–0.4 in) tail Habitat: Forest |
| Xeronycteris | Gregorin & Ditchfield, 2005 One species: X. vieirai (Vieira's long-tongued bat) | Eastern South America | Size: Unknown Habitats: Forest and savanna |

Subfamily Glyphonycterinae – Baker, Cirranello, Solari, & Simmons, 2016 – three genera
| Name | Authority and species | Range | Size and ecology |
|---|---|---|---|
| Glyphonycteris (big-eared bat) | Thomas, 1896 Three species: G. behnii (Behn's bat); G. daviesi (Davies's big-eared bat, pictured); G. sylvestris (Tricolored big-eared bat) | Central America and South America | Size range: 4 cm (2 in) long, plus 0.5 cm (0.2 in) tail (tricolored big-eared bat) to 9 cm (4 in) long, plus 2 cm (1 in) tail (Davies's big-eared bat) Habitats: Savanna, caves, and forest |
| Neonycteris | Sanborn, 1949 One species: N. pusilla (Least big-eared bat) | Northern South America | Size: Unknown Habitat: Forest |
| Trinycteris | Sanborn, 1949 One species: T. nicefori (Niceforo's big-eared bat) | Central America and northern and eastern South America | Size: 5–7 cm (2–3 in) long, plus 0.5–2 cm (0.2–0.8 in) tail Habitat: Forest |

Subfamily Lonchophyllinae – Griffiths, 1982 – three genera
| Name | Authority and species | Range | Size and ecology |
|---|---|---|---|
| Hsunycteris | Parlos, Timm, Swier, Zeballos, & Baker, 2014 Four species: H. cadenai (Cadena's long-tongued bat); H. dashe (Dashe's nectar bat); H. pattoni (Patton's long-tongued bat); H. thomasi (Thomas's nectar bat) | Central America and northern South America | Size range: 4 cm (2 in) long, plus 0.5 cm (0.2 in) tail (Dashe's nectar bat) to 6 cm (2 in) long, plus 1 cm (0 in) tail (Cadena's long-tongued bat) Habitats: Forest and caves Diets: {{{hunting}}} |
| Lionycteris | Thomas, 1913 One species: L. spurrelli (Chestnut long-tongued bat) | Central America and northern South America | Size: 4–7 cm (2–3 in) long, plus 0.5–1 cm (0.2–0.4 in) tail Habitats: Forest, savanna, and caves |
| Lonchophylla (nectar bat) | Thomas, 1903 Thirteen species: L. bokermanni (Bokermann's nectar bat); L. chocoana (Chocoan long-tongued bat); L. concava (Central American nectar bat); L. dekeyseri (Dekeyser's nectar bat); L. fornicata (Pacific Forest long-tongued bat); L. handleyi (Handley's nectar bat); L. hesperia (Western nectar bat); L. inexpectata (Caatinga nectar bat); L. mordax (Goldman's nectar bat); L. orcesi (Orcés's long-tongued bat); L. orienticollina (Eastern Cordilleran nectar bat); L. peracchii (Peracchi's nectar bat); L. robusta (Orange nectar bat, pictured) | Central America and South America | Size range: 4 cm (2 in) long, plus 0.5 cm (0.2 in) tail (Dekeyser's nectar bat) to 9 cm (4 in) long, plus 1 cm (0.4 in) tail (Handley's nectar bat) Habitats: Savanna, caves, and forest |

Subfamily Lonchorhininae – J. E. Gray, 1866 – one genus
| Name | Authority and species | Range | Size and ecology |
|---|---|---|---|
| Lonchorhina (sword-nosed bat) | Tomes, 1863 Six species: L. aurita (Tomes's sword-nosed bat, pictured); L. fernandezi (Fernandez's sword-nosed bat); L. inusitata (Northern sword-nosed bat); L. mankomara (Mother Mara's sword-nosed bat); L. marinkellei (Marinkelle's sword-nosed bat); L. orinocensis (Orinoco sword-nosed bat) | Mexico, Central America, and South America | Size range: 4 cm (2 in) long, plus 4 cm (2 in) tail (Orinoco sword-nosed bat) to 8 cm (3 in) long, plus 7 cm (3 in) tail (Marinkelle's sword-nosed bat) Habitats: Forest, grassland, rocky areas, savanna, and caves |

Subfamily Macrotinae – Bussche, 1992 – one genus
| Name | Authority and species | Range | Size and ecology |
|---|---|---|---|
| Macrotus (leaf-nosed bat) | J. E. Gray, 1843 Two species: M. californicus (California leaf-nosed bat, pictured); M. waterhousii (Waterhouse's leaf-nosed bat) | Western United States, Mexico, Central America, and Caribbean | Size range: 8–11 cm (3–4 in) long, plus 2–5 cm (1–2 in) tail (multiple) Habitats: Caves, shrubland, and forest |

Subfamily Micronycterinae – Bussche, 1992 – two genera
| Name | Authority and species | Range | Size and ecology |
|---|---|---|---|
| Lampronycteris | Sanborn, 1949 One species: L. brachyotis (Yellow-throated big-eared bat) | Mexico, Central America, and South America | Size: 5–7 cm (2–3 in) long, plus 0.5–2 cm (0.2–0.8 in) tail Habitats: Forest and caves |
| Micronycteris (big-eared bat) | J. E. Gray, 1866 Thirteen species: M. brosseti (Brosset's big-eared bat); M. buriri (Saint Vincent big-eared bat); M. giovanniae (Giovanni's big-eared bat); M. hirsuta (Hairy big-eared bat); M. matses (Matses's big-eared bat); M. megalotis (Little big-eared bat, pictured); M. microtis (Common big-eared bat); M. minuta (White-bellied big-eared bat); M. sanborni (Sanborn's big-eared bat); M. schmidtorum (Schmidts's big-eared bat); M. simmonsae (Simmons' big-eared bat); M. tresamici (Three friends big-eared bat); M. yatesi (Yates's big-eared bat) | Mexico, Central America, and South America | Size range: 3 cm (1 in) long, plus 1 cm (0.4 in) tail (little big-eared bat) to 8 cm (3 in) long, plus 2 cm (1 in) tail (hairy big-eared bat) Habitats: Caves, savanna, and forest (some species unknown) |

Subfamily Phyllostominae – J. E. Gray, 1825 – ten genera
| Name | Authority and species | Range | Size and ecology |
|---|---|---|---|
| Chrotopterus | Peters, 1865 One species: C. auritus (Big-eared woolly bat) | Mexico, Central America, and South America | Size: 10–13 cm (4–5 in) long, plus 0.5–2 cm (0.2–0.8 in) tail Habitats: Forest and caves |
| Gardnerycteris (hairy-nosed bat) | Hurtado & Pacheco, 2014 Three species: G. crenulatum (Striped hairy-nosed bat, pictured); G. keenani (Keenan's hairy-nosed bat); G. koepckeae (Koepcke's hairy-nosed bat) | Mexico, Central America, and South America | Size range: 6 cm (2 in) long, plus 2 cm (1 in) tail (Koepcke's hairy-nosed bat) to 10 cm (4 in) long, plus 3 cm (1 in) tail (striped hairy-nosed bat) Habitats: Savanna and forest |
| Lophostoma (round-eared bat) | d'Orbigny, 1836 Eight species: L. brasiliense (Pygmy round-eared bat, pictured); L. carrikeri (Carriker's round-eared bat); L. evotis (Davis's round-eared bat); L. kalkoae (Kalko's round-eared bat); L. nicaraguae (Mesoamerican round-eared bat); L. occidentale (Western round-eared bat); L. schulzi (Schultz's round-eared bat); L. silvicolum (White-throated round-eared bat) | Mexico, Central America, and South America | Size range: 4 cm (2 in) long, plus 1 cm (0.4 in) tail (Davis's round-eared bat) to 9 cm (4 in) long, plus 3 cm (1 in) tail (white-throated round-eared bat) Habitats: Savanna and forest |
| Macrophyllum | J. E. Gray, 1838 One species: M. macrophyllum (Long-legged bat) | Mexico, Central America, and South America | Size: 4–6 cm (2–2 in) long, plus 3–5 cm (1–2 in) tail Habitat: Forest |
| Mimon (golden bat) | J. E. Gray, 1847 Two species: M. bennettii (Golden bat); M. cozumelae (Cozumelan golden bat, pictured) | Northern and southeastern South America and Mexico, Central America, and northwestern South America | Size range: 6 cm (2 in) long, plus 1 cm (0.4 in) tail (golden bat) to 10 cm (4 in) long, plus 3 cm (1 in) tail (Cozumelan golden bat) Habitats: Caves, savanna, and forest |
| Phylloderma (pale-faced bat) | Peters, 1865 Two species: P. septentrionale (Northern pale-faced bat); P. stenops (Pale-faced bat) | Mexico, Central America, and South America | Size: 8–11 cm (3–4 in) long, plus 1–3 cm (0.4–1.2 in) tail Habitats: Forest, savanna, and inland wetlands |
| Phyllostomus (spear-nosed bat) | Lacépède, 1799 Four species: P. discolor (Pale spear-nosed bat); P. elongatus (Lesser spear-nosed bat); P. hastatus (Greater spear-nosed bat, pictured); P. latifolius (Guianan spear-nosed bat) | South America, Northern South America, Mexico, Central America, and South America, and Central America and South America | Size range: 6 cm (2 in) long, plus 1 cm (0.4 in) tail (lesser spear-nosed bat) to 13 cm (5 in) long, plus 4 cm (2 in) tail (greater spear-nosed bat) Habitats: Savanna, caves, and forest |
| Tonatia (round-eared bat) | J. E. Gray, 1827 Three species: T. bakeri (Baker's round-eared bat); T. bidens (Greater round-eared bat); T. saurophila (Stripe-headed round-eared bat, pictured) | Mexico, Central America, and South America and Eastern South America | Size range: 6–9 cm (2–4 in) long, plus 1–2 cm (0.4–0.8 in) tail (multiple) Habitat: Forest |
| Trachops (fringe-lipped bat) | J. E. Gray, 1847 Three species: T. cirrhosus (Fringe-lipped bat, pictured); T. coffini (Coffin's fringe-lipped bat); T. ehrhardti (Ehrhardt's fringe-lipped bat) | Mexico, Central America, and South America | Size: 8–11 cm (3–4 in) long, plus 1–2 cm (0.4–0.8 in) tail Habitats: Forest and caves |
| Vampyrum | Rafinesque, 1815 One species: V. spectrum (Spectral bat) | Mexico, Central America, and South America | Size: 12–16 cm (5–6 in) long, with no tail Habitat: Forest |

Subfamily Rhinophyllinae – Baker, Cirranello, Solari, & Simmons, 2016 – one genus
| Name | Authority and species | Range | Size and ecology |
|---|---|---|---|
| Rhinophylla (little fruit bat) | Peters, 1865 Three species: R. alethina (Hairy little fruit bat); R. fischerae (Fischer's little fruit bat); R. pumilio (Dwarf little fruit bat, pictured) | Northern South America | Size range: 4–6 cm (2–2 in) long, with no tail (multiple) Habitat: Forest |

Subfamily Stenodermatinae – Gervais, 1856 – 20 genera
| Name | Authority and species | Range | Size and ecology |
|---|---|---|---|
| Ametrida | J. E. Gray, 1847 One species: A. centurio (Little white-shouldered bat) | Central America and northern South America | Size: 3–6 cm (1–2 in) long, with no tail Habitat: Forest |
| Ardops | Miller, 1906 One species: A. nichollsi (Tree bat) | Caribbean | Size: 6–7 cm (2–3 in) long, with no tail Habitat: Forest |
| Ariteus | J. E. Gray, 1838 One species: A. flavescens (Jamaican fig-eating bat) | Jamaica | Size: 5–7 cm (2–3 in) long, with no tail Habitat: Forest |
| Artibeus (neotropical fruit bat) | Leach, 1821 13 species: A. aequatorialis (Ecuadorian fruit-eating bat); A. amplus (Large fruit-eating bat); A. concolor (Brown fruit-eating bat); A. fimbriatus (Fringed fruit-eating bat); A. fraterculus (Fraternal fruit-eating bat); A. hirsutus (Hairy fruit-eating bat); A. inopinatus (Honduran fruit-eating bat); A. intermedius (Common fruit-eating bat); A. jamaicensis (Jamaican fruit bat, pictured); A. lituratus (Great fruit-eating bat); A. obscurus (Dark fruit-eating bat); A. planirostris (Flat-faced fruit-eating bat); A. schwartzi (Schwartz's fruit-eating bat) | Mexico, Caribbean, Central America, and northern South America | Size range: 5 cm (2 in) long, with no tail (brown fruit-eating bat) to 11 cm (4 in) long (great fruit-eating bat) Habitats: Rocky areas, savanna, caves, and forest |
| Centurio | J. E. Gray, 1842 One species: C. senex (Wrinkle-faced bat) | Mexico, Central America, and northern South America | Size: 5–7 cm (2–3 in) long, with no tail Habitat: Forest |
| Chiroderma (big-eyed bat) | Peters, 1860 Seven species: C. doriae (Brazilian big-eyed bat); C. gorgasi (Fierce big-eyed bat); C. improvisum (Guadeloupe big-eyed bat); C. salvini (Salvin's big-eyed bat, pictured); C. scopaeum (Mexican big-eyed bat); C. trinitatum (Little big-eyed bat); C. villosum (Hairy big-eyed bat) | Mexico, Central America, Caribbean, and northern South America | Size range: 5 cm (2 in) long, with no tail (hairy big-eyed bat) to 9 cm (4 in) long (Guadeloupe big-eyed bat) Habitats: Caves, savanna, and forest |
| Dermanura (fruit-eating bat) | Gervais, 1856 11 species: D. anderseni (Andersen's fruit-eating bat); D. aztecus (Aztec fruit-eating bat); D. bogotensis (Bogota fruit-eating bat); D. cinereus (Gervais's fruit-eating bat); D. glaucus (Silver fruit-eating bat); D. gnomus (Gnome fruit-eating bat); D. phaeotis (Pygmy fruit-eating bat); D. rava (Little fruit-eating bat); D. rosenbergi (Rosenberg's fruit-eating bat); D. toltecus (Toltec fruit-eating bat); D. watsoni (Thomas's fruit-eating bat, pictured) | Mexico, Central America, and South America | Size range: 4 cm (2 in) long, with no tail (Andersen's fruit-eating bat) to 8 cm (3 in) long (Aztec fruit-eating bat) Habitats: Savanna, caves, and forest |
| Ectophylla | H. Allen, 1892 One species: E. alba (Honduran white bat) | Central America | Size: 3–5 cm (1–2 in) long, with no tail Habitat: Forest |
| Enchisthenes | K. Andersen, 1906 One species: E. hartii (Velvety fruit-eating bat) | Mexico, Central America, and northern South America | Size: 5–7 cm (2–3 in) long, with no tail Habitat: Forest |
| Mesophylla | Thomas, 1901 One species: M. macconnelli (MacConnell's bat) | Central America and northern South America | Size: 4–5 cm (2–2 in) long, with no tail Habitat: Forest |
| Phyllops | Peters, 1865 One species: P. falcatus (Cuban fig-eating bat) | Caribbean | Size: 5–7 cm (2–3 in) long, with no tail Habitat: Forest |
| Platyrrhinus (broad-nosed bat) | Saussure, 1860 19 species: P. albericoi (Alberico's broad-nosed bat); P. angustirostris (Slender broad-nosed bat); P. aquilus (Darien broad-nosed bat); P. aurarius (Eldorado broad-nosed bat); P. brachycephalus (Short-headed broad-nosed bat); P. dorsalis (Thomas's broad-nosed bat); P. fusciventris (Brown-bellied broad-nosed bat); P. guianensis (Guianan broad-nosed bat); P. helleri (Heller's broad-nosed bat); P. incarum (Incan broad-nosed bat); P. infuscus (Buffy broad-nosed bat); P. ismaeli (Ismael's broad-nosed bat); P. lineatus (White-lined broad-nosed bat); P. masu (Quechua broad-nosed bat); P. matapalensis (Matapalo broad-nosed bat); P. nitelinea (Western broad-nosed bat); P. recifinus (Recife broad-nosed bat, pictured); P. umbratus (Shadowy broad-nosed bat); P. vittatus (Greater broad-nosed bat) | Mexico, Central America, and South America | Size range: 5 cm (2 in) long, with no tail (brown-bellied broad-nosed bat) to 11 cm (4 in) long (buffy broad-nosed bat) Habitats: Caves, savanna, and forest |
| Pygoderma | Peters, 1863 One species: P. bilabiatum (Ipanema bat) | Central and eastern South America | Size: Unknown Habitat: Forest |
| Sphaeronycteris | Peters, 1882 One species: S. toxophyllum (Visored bat) | Northern South America | Size: 5–9 cm (2–4 in) long, with no tail Habitat: Forest |
| Stenoderma | E. Geoffroy, 1818 One species: S. rufum (Red fruit bat) | Caribbean | Size: 6–7 cm (2–3 in) long, with no tail Habitat: Forest |
| Sturnira (yellow-shouldered bat) | J. E. Gray, 1842 25 species: S. adrianae (Adriana's yellow-shouldered bat); S. angeli (Guadeloupe yellow-shouldered bat); S. aratathomasi (Aratathomas's yellow-shouldered bat); S. bakeri (Baker's yellow-shouldered bat); S. bidens (Bidentate yellow-shouldered bat); S. boadai (Boada's yellow-shouldered bat); S. bogotensis (Bogotá yellow-shouldered bat); S. burtonlimi (Burton's yellow-shouldered bat); S. erythromos (Hairy yellow-shouldered bat); S. giannae (Gianna's yellow-shouldered bat); S. hondurensis (Honduran yellow-shouldered bat); S. koopmanhilli (Choco yellow-shouldered bat); S. lilium (Little yellow-shouldered bat); S. ludovici (Highland yellow-shouldered bat); S. luisi (Louis's yellow-shouldered bat); S. magna (Greater yellow-shouldered bat); S. mistratensis (Mistratoan yellow-shouldered bat); S. mordax (Talamancan yellow-shouldered bat); S. nana (Lesser yellow-shouldered bat); S. oporaphilum (Tschudi's yellow-shouldered bat); S. parvidens (Northern yellow-shouldered bat, pictured); S. paulsoni (Paulson's yellow-shouldered bat); S. perla (Perla yellow-shouldered bat); S. sorianoi (Soriano's yellow-shouldered bat); S. tildae (Tilda's yellow-shouldered bat) | Mexico, Central America, Caribbean, and South America | Size range: 4 cm (2 in) long, with no tail (lesser yellow-shouldered bat) to 11 cm (4 in) long (Aratathomas's yellow-shouldered bat) Habitat: Forest |
| Uroderma (tent-making bat) | Peters, 1865 Five species: U. bakeri (Baker's tent-making bat); U. bilobatum (Tent-making bat, pictured); U. convexum (Arcuate tent-making bat); U. davisi (Davis's tent-making bat); U. magnirostrum (Brown tent-making bat) | Mexico, Central America, and South America | Size range: 5 cm (2 in) long, with no tail (brown tent-making bat) to 8 cm (3 in) long (tent-making bat) Habitats: Savanna and forest |
| Vampyressa (little yellow-eared bat) | Thomas, 1900 Six species: V. elisabethae (Kalko's yellow-eared bat); V. melissa (Melissa's yellow-eared bat); V. pusilla (Southern little yellow-eared bat, pictured); V. thyone (Northern little yellow-eared bat); V. villai (Villa's yellow-eared bat); V. voragine (Vorágine's yellow-eared bat) | Mexico, Central America, and South America | Size range: 4 cm (2 in) long, with no tail (northern little yellow-eared bat) to 7 cm (3 in) long (Melissa's yellow-eared bat) Habitat: Forest |
| Vampyriscus (yellow-eared bat) | Thomas, 1900 Three species: V. bidens (Bidentate yellow-eared bat, pictured); V. brocki (Brock's yellow-eared bat); V. nymphaea (Striped yellow-eared bat) | Central America and northern South America | Size range: 4 cm (2 in) long, with no tail (Brock's yellow-eared bat) to 7 cm (3 in) long (striped yellow-eared bat) Habitat: Forest |
| Vampyrodes (stripe-faced bat) | Thomas, 1900 Two species: V. caraccioli (Great stripe-faced bat, pictured); V. major (Greater stripe-faced bat) | Central America and northern South America | Size range: 7 cm (3 in) long, with no tail (great stripe-faced bat) to 9 cm (4 in) long (greater stripe-faced bat) Habitat: Forest |

===== Family Thyropteridae =====
Members of the Thyropteridae family are called thyropterids, or colloquially disk-winged bats, and include five extant species in a single genus. They are all insectivorous.

Not assigned to a named subfamily – one genus
| Name | Authority and species | Range | Size and ecology |
|---|---|---|---|
| Thyroptera (disk-winged bat) | Miller, 1907 Five species: T. devivoi (De Vivo's disk-winged bat); T. discifera (Peters's disk-winged bat, pictured); T. lavali (LaVal's disk-winged bat); T. tricolor (Spix's disk-winged bat); T. wynneae (Patricia's disk-winged bat) | Central America and South America | Size range: 3 cm (1 in) long, plus 2 cm (1 in) tail (De Vivo's disk-winged bat) to 6 cm (2 in) long, plus 4 cm (2 in) tail (LaVal's disk-winged bat) Habitats: Forest and savanna |

==== Superfamily Vespertilionoidea ====
===== Family Cistugidae =====
Members of the Cistugidae family are called cistugids, or colloquially wing-gland bats, and include two extant species in a single genus. They are both insectivorous.

Not assigned to a named subfamily – one genus
| Name | Authority and species | Range | Size and ecology |
|---|---|---|---|
| Cistugo (wing-gland bat) | Thomas, 1912 Two species: C. lesueuri (Lesueur's hairy bat, pictured); C. seabrai (Angolan hairy bat) | Southern Africa | Size range: 4 cm (2 in) long, plus 3 cm (1 in) tail (Angolan hairy bat) to 6 cm (2 in) long, plus 5 cm (2 in) tail (Lesueur's hairy bat) Habitats: Rocky areas, shrubland, grassland, and desert |

===== Family Miniopteridae =====
Members of the Miniopteridae family are called miniopterids, and include bent-winged bats, or long-fingered bats. They are all insectivorous. Miniopteridae comprises 41 extant species in a single genus.

Not assigned to a named subfamily – one genus
| Name | Authority and species | Range | Size and ecology |
|---|---|---|---|
| Miniopterus | Bonaparte, 1837 41 species: M. aelleni (Aellen's long-fingered bat); M. africanus (African long-fingered bat); M. ambohitrensis (Montagne d'Ambre long-fingered bat); M. arenarius (Sandy long-fingered bat); M. australis (Little bent-wing bat); M. brachytragos (Madagascar long-fingered bat); M. egeri (Eger's long-fingered bat); M. eschscholtzii (Eschscholtz's bent-winged bat); M. fraterculus (Lesser long-fingered bat); M. fuliginosus (Eastern bent-wing bat); M. fuscus (Southeast Asian long-fingered bat); M. gleni (Glen's long-fingered bat); M. griffithsi (Griffith's long-fingered bat); M. griveaudi (Griveaud's long-fingered bat); M. inflatus (Greater long-fingered bat); M. macrocneme (Small melanesian long-fingered bat); M. maghrebensis (Maghrebian bent-wing bat); M. magnater (Western bent-winged bat); M. mahafaliensis (Mahafaly long-fingered bat); M. majori (Major's long-fingered bat); M. manavi (Manavi long-fingered bat); M. medius (Intermediate long-fingered bat); M. minor (Least long-fingered bat); M. mossambicus (Mozambique long-fingered bat); M. natalensis (Natal long-fingered bat); M. newtoni (Newton's long-fingered bat); M. nimbae (Nimba long-fingered bat); M. orianae (Australasian bent-wing bat); M. pallidus (Pale bent-wing bat); M. paululus (Philippine long-fingered bat); M. petersoni (Peterson's long-fingered bat); M. phillipsi (Phillips's long-fingered bat); M. pusillus (Small bent-winged bat); M. robustior (Loyalty bent-winged bat); M. schreibersii (Common bent-wing bat); M. shortridgei (Shortridge's long-fingered bat); M. sororculus (Sororcula long-fingered bat); M. srinii (Srini's bent-winged bat); M. tristis (Great bent-winged bat); M. villiersi (Villiers's bent-winged bat); M. wilsoni (Wilson's long-fingered bat) | Europe, Africa, and western, southeastern, and eastern Asia | Size range: 3 cm (1 in) long, plus 3 cm (1 in) tail (little bent-wing bat) to 8 cm (3 in) long, plus 7 cm (3 in) tail (great bent-winged bat) Habitats: Shrubland, forest, grassland, rocky areas, caves, savanna, inland wetlands, and desert |

===== Family Molossidae =====
Members of the Molossidae family are called molossids, or colloquially free-tailed bats. They are all insectivorous. Miniopteridae comprises 120 extant species, divided into 22 genera. These genera are grouped into two subfamilies: Molossinae, containing 132 species, and Tomopeatinae, which consists of a single species.

Subfamily Molossinae – Gervais, 1856 – 21 genera
| Name | Authority and species | Range | Size and ecology |
|---|---|---|---|
| Austronomus (Australasian free-tailed bat) | Troughton, 1944 Two species: A. australis (White-striped free-tailed bat, pictured); A. kuboriensis (New Guinea free-tailed bat) | Australia and New Guinea | Size range: 7 cm (3 in) long, plus 4 cm (2 in) tail (New Guinea free-tailed bat) to 10 cm (4 in) long, plus 6 cm (2 in) tail (white-striped free-tailed bat) Habitats: Shrubland, forest, grassland, savanna, and desert |
| Cheiromeles (naked bat) | Horsfield, 1824 Two species: C. parvidens (Lesser naked bat); C. torquatus (Hairless bat) | Southeastern Asia | Size range: 10 cm (4 in) long, plus 5 cm (2 in) tail (lesser naked bat) to 18 cm (7 in) long, plus 8 cm (3 in) tail (hairless bat) Habitats: Caves and forest |
| Cynomops (dog-faced bat) | Thomas, 1920 Nine species: C. abrasus (Cinnamon dog-faced bat, pictured); C. freemani (Freeman's dog-faced bat); C. greenhalli (Greenhall's dog-faced bat); C. kuizha (Awa dog-faced bat); C. mastivus (Mastiff dog-faced bat); C. mexicanus (Mexican dog-faced bat); C. milleri (Miller's dog-faced bat); C. planirostris (Southern dog-faced bat); C. tonkigui (Waorani dog-faced bat) | Mexico, Central America, and South America | Size range: 5 cm (2 in) long, plus 2 cm (1 in) tail (Greenhall's dog-faced bat) to 9 cm (4 in) long, plus 5 cm (2 in) tail (cinnamon dog-faced bat) Habitat: Forest |
| Eumops (bonneted bat) | Miller, 1906 Seventeen species: E. auripendulus (Black bonneted bat); E. bonariensis (Dwarf bonneted bat, pictured); E. chimaera (Chimaera bonneted bat); E. chiribaya (Chiribaya bonneted bat); E. dabbenei (Big bonneted bat); E. delticus (Delta bonneted bat); E. ferox (Fierce bonneted bat); E. floridanus (Florida bonneted bat); E. glaucinus (Wagner's bonneted bat); E. hansae (Sanborn's bonneted bat); E. maurus (Guianan bonneted bat); E. nanus (Northern dwarf bonneted bat); E. patagonicus (Patagonian bonneted bat); E. perotis (Western mastiff bat); E. trumbulli (Colombian bonneted bat); E. underwoodi (Underwood's bonneted bat); E. wilsoni (Wilson's bonneted bat) | Southern North America, Central America, and South America | Size range: 4 cm (2 in) long, plus 2 cm (1 in) tail (northern dwarf bonneted bat) to 13 cm (5 in) long, plus 6 cm (2 in) tail (Colombian bonneted bat) Habitats: Forest, coastal marine, rocky areas, savanna, caves, and desert |
| Micronomus | J. E. Gray, 1839 One species: M. norfolkensis (East-coast free-tailed bat) | Eastern Australia | Size: 5–6 cm (2–2 in) long, plus 3–5 cm (1–2 in) tail Habitats: Forest and shrubland |
| Molossops (dog-faced bat) | Peters, 1865 Four species: M. aequatorianus (Equatorial dog-faced bat); M. mattogrossensis (Mato Grosso dog-faced bat); M. neglectus (Rufous dog-faced bat, pictured); M. temminckii (Dwarf dog-faced bat) | South America | Size range: 4 cm (2 in) long, plus 1 cm (0.4 in) tail (dwarf dog-faced bat) to 7 cm (3 in) long, plus 4 cm (2 in) tail (rufous dog-faced bat) Habitats: Rocky areas, and forest (some species unknown) |
| Molossus (velvety free-tailed bat) | Geoffroy, 1805 16 species: M. alvarezi (Alvarez's mastiff bat); M. aztecus (Aztec mastiff bat); M. bondae (Bonda mastiff bat); M. coibensis (Coiban mastiff bat); M. currentium (Thomas's mastiff bat); M. fentoni (Fenton's mastiff bat); M. fluminensis (River mastiff bat); M. melini (Melin's mastiff bat); M. molossus (Velvety free-tailed bat, pictured); M. nigricans (Ebon mastiff bat); M. paranaensis (Paraná mastiff bat); M. pretiosus (Miller's mastiff bat); M. rufus (Black mastiff bat); M. sinaloae (Sinaloan mastiff bat); M. tropidorhynchus (Keel-nosed mastiff bat); M. verrilli (Verrill's mastiff bat) | Mexico, Caribbean, Central America, and South America | Size range: 5 cm (2 in) long, plus 3 cm (1 in) tail (Aztec mastiff bat) to 9 cm (4 in) long, plus 5 cm (2 in) tail (Alvarez's mastiff bat) Habitats: Shrubland, forest, grassland, savanna, and caves |
| Mops (free-tailed bat) | Lesson, 1842 36 species: M. aloysiisabaudiae (Duke of Abruzzi's free-tailed bat); M. ansorgei (Ansorge's free-tailed bat); M. atsinanana (Madagascar free-tailed bat); M. bakarii (Bakari's free-tailed bat); M. bemmeleni (Gland-tailed free-tailed bat); M. bivittatus (Spotted free-tailed bat); M. brachypterus (Sierra Leone free-tailed bat); M. bregullae (Fijian mastiff bat); M. chapini (Chapin's free-tailed bat); M. condylurus (Angolan free-tailed bat); M. congicus (Medje free-tailed bat); M. demonstrator (Mongalla free-tailed bat); M. gallagheri (Gallagher's free-tailed bat); M. jobensis (Northern freetail bat); M. jobimena (Black and red free-tailed bat); M. johorensis (Northern free-tailed bat); M. leucogaster (Grandidier's free-tailed bat); M. leucostigma (Malagasy white-bellied free-tailed bat); M. major (Lappet-eared free-tailed bat); M. midas (Midas free-tailed bat); M. mops (Malayan free-tailed bat); M. nanulus (Dwarf free-tailed bat); M. niangarae (Niangara free-tailed bat); M. nigeriae (Nigerian free-tailed bat); M. niveiventer (White-bellied free-tailed bat); M. petersoni (Peterson's free-tailed bat); M. plicatus (Wrinkle-lipped free-tailed bat, pictured); M. pumilus (Little free-tailed bat); M. pusillus (Seychelles free-tailed bat); M. russatus (Russet free-tailed bat); M. sarasinorum (Sulawesi free-tailed bat); M. solomonis (Solomons mastiff bat); M. spurrelli (Spurrell's free-tailed bat); M. thersites (Railer bat); M. tomensis (São Tomé free-tailed bat); M. trevori (Trevor's free-tailed bat) | Africa and eastern and southeastern Asia | Size range: 4 cm (2 in) long, plus 2 cm (1 in) tail (little free-tailed bat) to 10 cm (4 in) long, plus 6 cm (2 in) tail (Medje free-tailed bat) Habitats: Shrubland, forest, coastal marine, rocky areas, savanna, caves, and desert |
| Mormopterus (little mastiff bat) | Peters, 1865 Seven species: M. acetabulosus (Natal free-tailed bat, pictured); M. doriae (Sumatran mastiff bat); M. francoismoutoui (Reunion little mastiff bat); M. jugularis (Peters's wrinkle-lipped bat); M. kalinowskii (Kalinowski's mastiff bat); M. minutus (Little goblin bat); M. phrudus (Incan little mastiff bat) | Western South America, Cuba, Madagascar and nearby islands, and island of Sumatra in Indonesia | Size range: 4 cm (2 in) long, plus 2 cm (1 in) tail (Kalinowski's mastiff bat) to 7 cm (3 in) long, plus 4 cm (2 in) tail (Peters's wrinkle-lipped bat) Habitats: Shrubland, forest, rocky areas, and caves |
| Myopterus (African free-tailed bat) | Geoffroy, 1818 Two species: M. daubentonii (Daubenton's free-tailed bat, pictured); M. whitleyi (Bini free-tailed bat) | Western and central Africa | Size range: 5 cm (2 in) long, plus 2 cm (1 in) tail (Bini free-tailed bat) to 8 cm (3 in) long, plus 5 cm (2 in) tail (Daubenton's free-tailed bat) Habitats: Savanna and forest |
| Neoplatymops | Peterson, 1965 One species: N. mattogrossensis (Mato Grosso dog-faced bat) | Northern South America | Size: 4–6 cm (2–2 in) long, plus 2–3 cm (1–1 in) tail Habitats: Forest and rocky areas Diet: {{{hunting}}} |
| Nyctinomops (free-tailed bat) | Miller, 1865 Four species: N. aurispinosus (Peale's free-tailed bat); N. femorosaccus (Pocketed free-tailed bat); N. laticaudatus (Broad-eared bat); N. macrotis (Big free-tailed bat, pictured) | North and South America | Size range: 5 cm (2 in) long, plus 3 cm (1 in) tail (broad-eared bat) to 9 cm (4 in) long, plus 7 cm (3 in) tail (big free-tailed bat) Habitats: Rocky areas, caves, and forest |
| Nyctinomus | Geoffroy, 1818 One species: N. aegyptiaca (Egyptian free-tailed bat) | Scattered Africa, Arabian Peninsula, and southern Asia | Size: 6–9 cm (2–4 in) long, plus 3–5 cm (1–2 in) tail Habitats: Savanna and shrubland Diet: {{{hunting}}} |
| Otomops (mastiff bat) | Thomas, 1913 Eight species: O. formosus (Javan mastiff bat); O. harrisoni (Harrison's large-eared giant mastiff bat); O. johnstonei (Johnstone's mastiff bat); O. madagascariensis (Madagascar free-tailed bat); O. martiensseni (Large-eared free-tailed bat); O. papuensis (Big-eared mastiff bat); O. secundus (Mantled mastiff bat); O. wroughtoni (Wroughton's free-tailed bat, pictured) | Africa, southern Arabian Peninsula, and southern and southeastern Asia | Size range: 6 cm (2 in) long, plus 3 cm (1 in) tail (big-eared mastiff bat) to 11 cm (4 in) long, plus 6 cm (2 in) tail (Harrison's large-eared giant mastiff bat) Habitats: Savanna, caves, and forest |
| Ozimops (Australian free-tailed bat) | Reardon, McKenzie, & Adams, 2014 Nine species: O. beccarii (Beccari's free-tailed bat); O. cobourgianus (Northern coastal free-tailed bat); O. halli (Cape York free-tailed bat); O. kitcheneri (South-western free-tailed bat); O. loriae (Loria's free-tailed bat); O. lumsdenae (Lumsden's free-tailed bat); O. petersi (Inland free-tailed bat); O. planiceps (Southern free-tailed bat); O. ridei (Ride's free-tailed bat) | Australia, southeastern Asia | Size range: 4 cm (2 in) long, plus 2 cm (1 in) tail (Cape York free-tailed bat) to 7 cm (3 in) long, plus 4 cm (2 in) tail (Beccari's free-tailed bat) Habitats: Shrubland, forest, grassland, savanna, caves, inland wetlands, and desert |
| Platymops | Thomas, 1906 One species: P. setiger (Peters's flat-headed bat) | Eastern Africa | Size: 5–8 cm (2–3 in) long, plus 2–4 cm (1–2 in) tail Habitats: Savanna and rocky areas |
| Promops (mastiff bat) | Gervais, 1856 Three species: P. centralis (Big crested mastiff bat); P. davisoni (Davison's mastiff bat); P. nasutus (Brown mastiff bat) | Southern Mexico, Central America, and South America | Size range: 5–10 cm (2–4 in) long, plus 4–7 cm (2–3 in) tail (big crested mastiff bat) Habitats: Forest (some species unknown) |
| Sauromys | Peterson, 1965 One species: S. petrophilus (Roberts's flat-headed bat) | Southern Africa | Size: 6–9 cm (2–4 in) long, plus 2–5 cm (1–2 in) tail Habitats: Savanna, shrubland, and rocky areas |
| Setirostris | Reardon, McKenzie, Cooper, Appleton, Carthew, & Adams, 2014 One species: S. eleryi (Hairy-nosed free-tailed bat) | Australia | Size: 4–5 cm (2–2 in) long, plus 2–4 cm (1–2 in) tail Habitats: Savanna, shrubland, and rocky areas |
| Tadarida (guano bat) | Rafinesque, 1814 Seven species: T. brasiliensis (Mexican free-tailed bat, pictured); T. fulminans (Madagascan large free-tailed bat); T. insignis (East Asian free-tailed bat); T. latouchei (La Touche's free-tailed bat); T. lobata (Kenyan big-eared free-tailed bat); T. teniotis (European free-tailed bat); T. ventralis (African giant free-tailed bat) | North America, South America, Africa, Eastern Asia, southern Europe, and western, eastern, and southeastern Asia and Madagascar | Size range: 4 cm (2 in) long, plus 2 cm (1 in) tail (Mexican free-tailed bat) to 11 cm (4 in) long, plus 7 cm (3 in) tail (African giant free-tailed bat) Habitats: Shrubland, forest, grassland, coastal marine, rocky areas, savanna, caves, and desert |

Subfamily Tomopeatinae – Miller, 1907 – one genus
| Name | Authority and species | Range | Size and ecology |
|---|---|---|---|
| Tomopeas | Miller, 1900 One species: T. ravus (Blunt-eared bat) | Peru | Size: 3–5 cm (1–2 in) long, plus 2–5 cm (1–2 in) tail Habitat: Caves |

===== Family Natalidae =====
Members of the Natalidae family are called natalids, or colloquially funnel-eared bats. They are all insectivorous. Natalidae comprises 11 extant species, divided into three genera.

Not assigned to a named subfamily – three genera
| Name | Authority and species | Range | Size and ecology |
|---|---|---|---|
| Chilonatalus (lesser funnel-eared bat) | Miller, 1898 Three species: C. macer (Cuban lesser funnel-eared bat); C. micropus (Cuban funnel-eared bat, pictured); C. tumidifrons (Bahaman funnel-eared bat) | Caribbean (in blue, teal, and purple) | Size range: Unknown Habitats: Caves and forest |
| Natalus (greater funnel-eared bat) | J. E. Gray, 1838 Seven species: N. jamaicensis (Jamaican greater funnel-eared bat); N. macrourus (Brazilian funnel-eared bat); N. major (Hispaniolan greater funnel-eared bat); N. mexicanus (Mexican greater funnel-eared bat, pictured); N. primus (Cuban greater funnel-eared bat); N. stramineus (Mexican funnel-eared bat); N. tumidirostris (Trinidadian funnel-eared bat) | Central America, South America, and Caribbean (in red and purple) | Size range: 3 cm (1 in) long, plus 4 cm (2 in) tail (Mexican greater funnel-eared bat) to 6 cm (2 in) long, plus 6 cm (2 in) tail (Jamaican greater funnel-eared bat) Habitats: Caves and forest |
| Nyctiellus | Gervais, 1855 One species: N. lepidus (Gervais's funnel-eared bat) | Cuba and The Bahamas | Size: Unknown Habitats: Forest and caves |

===== Family Vespertilionidae =====
Members of the Vespertilionidae family are called vespertilionids, or colloquially vesper bats, and include woolly bats, tube-nosed bats, mouse-eared bats, pipistrelles and serotines. They are all insectivorous, though one species also eats small birds. Vespertilionidae comprises 558 extant species, divided into 61 genera. These genera are grouped into four subfamilies: Kerivoulinae, or woolly bats; Murininae, or tube-nosed bats; Myotinae, or mouse-eared bats; and Vespertilioninae, which includes pipistrelles, serotines, and other bat species. Vespertilioninae additionally contains three species which have been made extinct since 1500 CE.

Subfamily Kerivoulinae – Miller, 1907 – two genera
| Name | Authority and species | Range | Size and ecology |
|---|---|---|---|
| Kerivoula (woolly bat) | J. E. Gray, 1842 28 species: K. africana (Tanzanian woolly bat); K. agnella (St. Aignan's trumpet-eared bat); K. argentata (Damara woolly bat); K. crypta (Cryptic woolly bat); K. cuprosa (Copper woolly bat); K. depressa (Flat-skulled woolly bat); K. dongduongana (Indochinese woolly bat); K. eriophora (Ethiopian woolly bat); K. flora (Flores woolly bat); K. furva (Dark woolly bat); K. hardwickii (Hardwicke's woolly bat); K. intermedia (Small woolly bat); K. kachinensis (Kachin woolly bat); K. krauensis (Krau woolly bat); K. lanosa (Lesser woolly bat); K. lenis (Lenis woolly bat); K. malpasi (Sri Lankan woolly bat); K. minuta (Least woolly bat); K. muscina (Fly River trumpet-eared bat); K. myrella (Bismarck trumpet-eared bat); K. papillosa (Papillose woolly bat); K. pellucida (Clear-winged woolly bat); K. phalaena (Spurrell's woolly bat); K. picta (Painted bat, pictured); K. pusilla (Bornean woolly bat); K. smithii (Smith's woolly bat); K. titania (Titania's woolly bat); K. whiteheadi (Whitehead's woolly bat) | Africa and southeastern Asia | Size range: 2 cm (1 in) long, plus 2 cm (1 in) tail (Least woolly bat) to 6 cm (2 in) long, plus 7 cm (3 in) tail (Kachin woolly bat) Habitats: Savanna, forest, caves, and grassland (some species unknown) |
| Phoniscus (trumpet-eared bat) | Miller, 1905 Four species: P. aerosa (Dubious trumpet-eared bat, pictured); P. atrox (Groove-toothed bat); P. jagorii (Peters's trumpet-eared bat); P. papuensis (Golden-tipped bat) | Papua New Guinea and eastern Australia, Southeastern Asia, and Possibly southeastern Africa | Size range: 4–6 cm (2–2 in) long, plus 3–5 cm (1–2 in) tail (multiple) Habitats: Forest and inland wetlands |

Subfamily Murininae – Miller, 1907 – three genera
| Name | Authority and species | Range | Size and ecology | | | |
|---|---|---|---|---|---|---|
| Harpiocephalus | J. E. Gray, 1842 One species: H. harpia (Lesser hairy-winged bat) | Southeastern Asia | Size: 5–8 cm (2–3 in) long, plus 4–5 cm (2–2 in) tail Habitat: Forest | | | |
| Harpiola (tube-nosed bat) | Thomas, 1915 Two species: H. grisea (Peters's tube-nosed bat); H. isodon (Formosan golden tube-nosed bat) | India and Taiwan | Size range: 4–6 cm (2–2 in) long, plus 2–4 cm (1–2 in) tail (multiple) Habitats: Forest, inland wetlands, and caves {{Animal genera table/row | name=Murina |common-name=tube-nosed bat | image-size=180px |image-alt=Silver bat | authority-name=J. E. Gray |authority-year=1842 |
| Murina | J. E. Gray, 1842 53 species: M. aenea (Bronze tube-nosed bat); M. alvarezi (Alvarez's tube-nosed bat); M. annamitica (Annam tube-nosed bat); M. aurata (Little tube-nosed bat); M. balaensis (Bala tube-nosed bat); M. baletei (Balete's tube-nosed bat); M. beelzebub (Beelzebub's tube-nosed bat); M. beibengensis (Beibeng tube-nosed bat); M. bicolor (Bicolored tube-nosed bat); M. chayuensis (Chayu tube-nosed bat); M. chrysochaetes (Golden-haired tube-nosed bat); M. cyclotis (Round-eared tube-nosed bat); M. eleryi (Elery's tube-nosed bat); M. feae (Fea's tube-nosed bat); M. fionae (Fiona's tube-nosed bat); M. florium (Flute-nosed bat); M. fusca (Dusky tube-nosed bat); M. gracilis (Slender tube-nosed bat); M. guilleni (Guillén's tube-nosed bat); M. harpioloides (Da Lat tube-nosed bat); M. harrisoni (Harrison's tube-nosed bat); M. hilgendorfi (Hilgendorf's tube-nosed bat, pictured); M. hilonghilong (Hilong-hilong tube-nosed bat); M. hkakaboraziensis (Hkakabo Razi tube-nosed bat); M. huanglianensis (Huanglianshan tube-nosed bat); M. huttoni (Hutton's tube-nosed bat); M. jaintiana (Jaintia tube-nosed bat); M. jinchui (Jinchu's tube-nosed bat); M. kontumensis (Kon Tum tube-nosed bat); M. leucogaster (Greater tube-nosed bat); M. liboensis (Libo tube-nosed bat); M. lorelieae (Lorelie's tube-nosed bat); M. luzonensis (Luzon tube-nosed bat); M. medogensis (Medog tube-nosed bat); M. milinensis (Milin tube-nosed bat); M. mindorensis (Mindoro tube-nosed bat); M. peninsularis (Peninsular tube-nosed bat); M. philippinensis (Philippine tube-nosed bat); M. pluvialis (Rainforest tube-nosed bat); M. puta (Taiwan tube-nosed bat); M. recondita (Hidden tube-nosed bat); M. rozendaali (Gilded tube-nosed bat); M. rubella (Fujian tube-nosed bat); M. ryukyuana (Ryukyu tube-nosed bat); M. shuipuensis (Shuipu tube-nosed bat); M. suilla (Brown tube-nosed bat); M. tenebrosa (Gloomy tube-nosed bat); M. tubinaris (Scully's tube-nosed bat); M. ussuriensis (Ussuri tube-nosed bat); M. walstoni (Walston's tube-nosed bat); M. yadongensis (Yadong tube-nosed bat); M. yuanyang (Yuanyang tube-nosed bat); M. yushuensis (Yushu tube-nosed bat) | Southern, southeastern, and eastern Asia, and Northern Australia | Size range: 3 cm (1 in) long, plus 3 cm (1 in) tail (Annam tube-nosed bat) to 7 cm (3 in) long, plus 4 cm (2 in) tail (brown tube-nosed bat) Habitats: Savanna, forest, and caves (some species unknown) | | | |

Subfamily Myotinae – Tate, 1942 – three genera
| Name | Authority and species | Range | Size and ecology |
|---|---|---|---|
| Eudiscopus | Conisbee, 1953 One species: E. denticulus (Disk-footed bat) | Southeastern Asia | Size: 4–5 cm (2–2 in) long, plus 3–5 cm (1–2 in) tail Habitat: Forest |
| Myotis (mouse-eared bat) | Kaup, 1829 143 species: M. adversus (Large-footed bat); M. albescens (Silver-tipped myotis); M. alcathoe (Alcathoe bat); M. altarium (Szechwan myotis); M. alticraniatus (Indochinese whiskered myotis); M. ancricola (Valley-dwelling myotis); M. anjouanensis (Anjouan myotis); M. annatessae (Anna Tess's bat); M. annectans (Hairy-faced bat); M. arescens (Valparaíso myotis); M. armiensis (Armién's myotis); M. atacamensis (Atacama myotis); M. ater (Peters's myotis); M. attenboroughi (Sir David Attenborough's myotis); M. auriculus (Southwestern myotis); M. australis (Australian myotis); M. austroriparius (Southeastern myotis); M. badius (Chestnut myotis); M. bakeri (Baker's myotis); M. barquezi (Barquez's myotis); M. bartelsii (Bartel's myotis); M. bechsteinii (Bechstein's bat); M. blythii (Lesser mouse-eared bat); M. bocagii (Rufous mouse-eared bat); M. bombinus (Far Eastern myotis); M. borneoensis (Bornean whiskered myotis); M. brandtii (Brandt's bat); M. bucharensis (Bocharic myotis); M. californicus (California myotis); M. capaccinii (Long-fingered bat); M. carteri (Carter's myotis); M. caucensis (Cauca River myotis); M. chiloensis (Chilean myotis); M. chinensis (Large myotis); M. ciliolabrum (Western small-footed bat); M. clydejonesi (Clyde Jones' myotis); M. cobanensis (Guatemalan myotis); M. crypticus (Cryptic myotis); M. dasycneme (Pond bat); M. daubentonii (Daubenton's bat); M. davidii (David's myotis); M. dieteri (Kock's mouse-eared bat); M. diminutus (Diminutive bat); M. dominicensis (Dominican myotis); M. elegans (Elegant myotis); M. emarginatus (Geoffroy's bat); M. escalerai (Escalera's bat); M. evotis (Long-eared myotis); M. extremus (Mexican black myotis); M. federatus (Malaysian whiskered myotis); M. fimbriatus (Fringed long-footed myotis); M. findleyi (Findley's myotis); M. formosus (Hodgson's bat); M. fortidens (Cinnamon myotis); M. frater (Fraternal myotis); M. gomantongensis (Gomantong myotis); M. goudoti (Malagasy mouse-eared bat); M. grisescens (Gray bat); M. guarani (Guaraní myotis); M. handleyi (Handley's myotis); M. hasseltii (Lesser large-footed bat); M. hayesi (Hayes' thick-thumbed myotis); M. hermani (Herman's myotis); M. himalaicus (Himalayan long-tailed myotis); M. horsfieldii (Horsfield's bat); M. hoveli (Hovel's myotis); M. huariorum (Huariorum myotis); M. hyrcanicus (Hyrcanian forest myotis); M. ikonnikovi (Ikonnikov's bat); M. indochinensis (Indochinese mouse-eared bat); M. insularum (Insular myotis); M. izecksohni (Izecksohn's myotis); M. kalkoae (Kalko's whiskered myotis); M. keaysi (Hairy-legged myotis); M. keenii (Keen's myotis); M. laniger (Chinese water myotis); M. larensis (Lara myotis); M. lavali (LaVal's myotis); M. leibii (Eastern small-footed myotis); M. levis (Yellowish myotis); M. longicaudatus (Long-tailed myotis); M. longipes (Kashmir cave bat); M. lucifugus (Little brown bat); M. macrodactylus (Eastern long-fingered bat); M. macropus (Large-footed myotis); M. macrotarsus (Pallid large-footed myotis); M. martiniquensis (Schwartz's myotis); M. midastactus (Golden myotis); M. moluccarum (Maluku myotis); M. montivagus (Burmese whiskered myotis); M. moratellii (Moratelli's myotis); M. morrisi (Morris's bat); M. muricola (Wall-roosting mouse-eared bat); M. myotis (Greater mouse-eared bat); M. mystacinus (Whiskered bat); M. nattereri (Natterer's bat); M. nesopolus (Curacao myotis); M. nigricans (Black myotis); M. nimbaensis (Nimba myotis); M. nipalensis (Nepal myotis); M. nustrale (Corsican myotis); M. nyctor (Barbados myotis); M. occultus (Arizona myotis); M. oxyotus (Montane myotis); M. pampa (Pampas myotis); M. pequinius (Beijing mouse-eared bat); M. petax (Eastern water bat); M. peytoni (Peyton's myotis); M. phanluongi (Phan Luong's myotis); M. pilosatibialis (Northern hairy-legged myotis); M. pilosus (Rickett's big-footed bat); M. planiceps (Flat-headed myotis); M. pruinosus (Frosted myotis); M. punicus (Felten's myotis); M. ridleyi (Ridley's bat); M. riparius (Riparian myotis); M. rosseti (Thick-thumbed myotis); M. ruber (Red myotis); M. rufoniger (Reddish-black myotis); M. rufopictus (Orange-fingered myotis); M. schaubi (Schaub's myotis); M. scotti (Scott's mouse-eared bat); M. secundus (Long-toed myotis); M. septentrionalis (Northern long-eared bat); M. sibiricus (Siberian bat); M. sicarius (Mandelli's mouse-eared bat); M. siligorensis (Himalayan whiskered bat); M. simus (Velvety myotis); M. sodalis (Indiana bat); M. soror (Reddish myotis); M. sowerbyi (Sowerby's whiskered myotis); M. stalkeri (Kei myotis); M. thysanodes (Fringed myotis); M. tricolor (Cape hairy bat); M. tschuliensis (Chuli myotis); M. velifer (Cave myotis); M. vivesi (Fish-eating bat); M. volans (Long-legged myotis); M. weberi (Weber's myotis); M. welwitschii (Welwitsch's bat); M. yanbarensis (Yanbaru whiskered bat); M. yumanensis (Yuma myotis); M. zenatius (Zenati myotis) | North America, South America, Europe, Africa, southern, southeastern, and eastern Asia, and Australia | Size range: 3 cm (1 in) long, plus 3 cm (1 in) tail (Alcathoe bat) to 10 cm (4 in) long, plus 6 cm (2 in) tail (large myotis) Habitats: Savanna, shrubland, forest, caves, desert, neritic marine, rocky areas, grassland, and inland wetlands (some species unknown) |
| Submyotodon (broad-muzzled bat) | Ziegler, 2003 Three species: S. caliginosus (Himalayan broad-muzzled bat); S. latirostris (Taiwan broad-muzzled bat); S. moupinensis (Moupin broad-muzzled bat) | Taiwan | Size: 3–4 cm (1–2 in) long, plus 3–4 cm (1–2 in) tail Habitat: Forest |

Subfamily Vespertilioninae – J. E. Gray, 1821 – fifty-three genera
| Name | Authority and species | Range | Size and ecology |
|---|---|---|---|
| Afronycteris (African serotine) | Monadjem, Patterson, & Demos, 2020 Three species: A. helios (Heller's serotine); A. nana (Banana serotine, pictured); A. rautenbachi (Kruger serotine) | Sub-Saharan Africa | Size range: 3 cm (1 in) long, plus 2 cm (1 in) tail (Heller's serotine) to 5 cm (2 in) long, plus 4 cm (2 in) tail (banana serotine) Habitats: Savanna and forest Diets: {{{hunting}}} |
| Afropipistrellus (African pipistrelle) | Thorn, Kock, & Cusin, 2020 Five species: A. bellieri (Bellier's pipistrelle); A. crassulus (Broad-headed serotine); A. grandidieri (Dobson's pipistrelle); A. happoldorum (Happolds' pipistrelle); A. musciculus (Mouselike pipistrelle) | Western, central, and eastern Africa | Size range: 4 cm (2 in) long, plus 2 cm (1 in) tail (broad-headed serotine) to 6 cm (2 in) long, plus 4 cm (2 in) tail (Happolds' pipistrelle) Habitats: Inland wetlands, savanna, and forest Diets: {{{hunting}}} |
| Alionoctula (eastern pipistrelle) | Kruskop, Solovyeva, & Kaznadzey, 2018 Nineteen species: A. abramus (Japanese house bat); A. adamsi (Forest pipistrelle); A. angulatus (Angulate pipistrelle); A. babu (Himalayan pipistrelle); A. ceylonicus (Kelaart's pipistrelle); A. collinus (Greater Papuan pipistrelle); A. coromandra (Indian pipistrelle); A. dhofarensis (Dhofar pipistrelle); A. endoi (Endo's pipistrelle); A. javanicus (Java pipistrelle); A. minahassae (Minahassa pipistrelle); A. murrayi (Christmas Island pipistrelle); A. papuanus (Lesser Papuan pipistrelle); A. paterculus (Mount Popa pipistrelle); A. stenopterus (Narrow-winged pipistrelle); A. sturdeei (Sturdee's pipistrelle); A. tenuis (Least pipistrelle, pictured); A. wattsi (Watts's pipistrelle); A. westralis (Northern pipistrelle) | Southern, eastern, and southeastern Asia, Northern Australia, Yemen, and Oman | Size range: 3 cm (1 in) long, plus 2 cm (1 in) tail (angulate pipistrelle) to 7 cm (3 in) long, plus 5 cm (2 in) tail (Kelaart's pipistrelle) Habitats: Inland wetlands, savanna, forest, caves, shrubland, grassland, and intertidal marine Diets: {{{hunting}}} |
| Antrozous (pallid bat) | H. Allen, 1862 Two species: A. koopmani (Koopman's pallid bat); A. pallidus (Pallid bat, pictured) | Western North America and Cuba | Size range: 5–9 cm (2–4 in) long, plus 3–6 cm (1–2 in) tail Habitats: Forest, rocky areas, and caves |
| Arielulus (gilded sprite) | Hill & Harrison, 1987 Five species: A. circumdatus (Bronze sprite, pictured); A. cuprosus (Coppery sprite); A. drungicus (Dulong sprite); A. societatis (Social sprite); A. torquatus (Necklace sprite) | Southeastern Asia | Size range: 4 cm (2 in) long, plus 3 cm (1 in) tail (bronze sprite) to 7 cm (3 in) long, plus 5 cm (2 in) tail (necklace sprite) Habitats: Forest and inland wetlands |
| Baeodon (yellow bat) | Miller, 1906 Two species: B. alleni (Allen's yellow bat); B. gracilis (Slender yellow bat) | Southern Mexico | Size range: 4–5 cm (2–2 in) long, plus 3–5 cm (1–2 in) tail (multiple) Habitat: Forest |
| Barbastella (barbastelle) | J. E. Gray, 1821 Six species: B. barbastellus (Western barbastelle, pictured); B. beijingensis (Beijing barbastelle); B. caspica (Caspian barbastelle); B. darjelingensis (Eastern barbastelle); B. leucomelas (Arabian barbastelle); B. pacifica (Japanese barbastelle) | Europe, northern Africa, and western, southern, and eastern Asia | Size range: 4 cm (2 in) long, plus 4 cm (2 in) tail (eastern barbastelle) to 6 cm (2 in) long, plus 5 cm (2 in) tail (Beijing barbastelle) Habitats: Shrubland, forest, caves, and rocky areas |
| Bauerus | Van Gelder, 1959 One species: B. dubiaquercus (Van Gelder's bat) | Southern Mexico and Central America | Size: 5–8 cm (2–3 in) long, plus 4–6 cm (2–2 in) tail Habitat: Forest |
| Cassistrellus (helmeted bat) | Manuel RuediRuedi, Judith L. EgerEger, Burton K. LimLim, & Gábor CsorbaCsorba, 2017 Two species: C. dimissus (Surat helmeted bat); C. yokdonensis (Yok Don helmeted bat) | Southeastern Asia | Size range: 5 cm (2 in) long, plus 4 cm (2 in) tail (Surat helmeted bat) to 7 cm (3 in) long, plus 6 cm (2 in) tail (Yok Don helmeted bat) Habitats: Unknown Diets: {{{hunting}}} |
| Chalinolobus (wattled bat) | Peters, 1866 Eight species: C. dwyeri (Large-eared pied bat, pictured); C. gouldii (Gould's wattled bat); C. morio (Chocolate wattled bat); C. neocaledonicus (New Caledonian wattled bat); C. nigrogriseus (Hoary wattled bat); C. orarius (Coastal lobe-lipped bat); C. picatus (Little pied bat); C. tuberculatus (New Zealand long-tailed bat) | New Zealand, Australia, and New Caledonia | Size range: 4 cm (2 in) long, plus 2 cm (1 in) tail (little pied bat) to 8 cm (3 in) long, plus 5 cm (2 in) tail (Gould's wattled bat) Habitats: Savanna, shrubland, forest, caves, and grassland |
| Cnephaeus (Old World serotine bat) | Kaup, 1829 Fifteen species: C. anatolicus (Anatolian serotine); C. bottae (Botta's serotine); C. floweri (Horn-skinned bat); C. gobiensis (Gobi big brown bat); C. hottentotus (Long-tailed house bat); C. isabellinus (Meridional serotine); C. japonensis (Japanese short-tailed bat); C. kobayashii (Kobayashi's bat); C. nilssonii (Northern bat, pictured); C. ognevi (Ognev's serotine); C. pachyomus (Oriental serotine); C. pachyotis (Thick-eared bat); C. platyops (Lagos serotine); C. serotinus (Serotine bat); C. tatei (Sombre bat) | Europe, Asia, and northern and eastern Africa | Size range: 4 cm (2 in) long, plus 3 cm (1 in) tail (Gobi big brown bat) to 9 cm (4 in) long, plus 7 cm (3 in) tail (Serotine bat) Habitats: Inland wetlands, rocky areas, savanna, forest, desert, shrubland, caves, and grassland Diets: {{{hunting}}} |
| Corynorhinus (American lump-nosed bat) | H. Allen, 1865 Four species: C. leonpaniaguae (Leon Paniagua's big-eared bat); C. mexicanus (Mexican big-eared bat, pictured); C. rafinesquii (Rafinesque's big-eared bat); C. townsendii (Townsend's big-eared bat) | North America | Size range: 3 cm (1 in) long, plus 4 cm (2 in) tail (Rafinesque's big-eared bat) to 6 cm (2 in) long, plus 6 cm (2 in) tail (Mexican big-eared bat) Habitats: Shrubland, forest, and caves |
| Eptesicus (serotine bat) | Rafinesque, 1820 Two species: E. dutertreus (Caribbean brown bat); E. fuscus (Big brown bat, pictured) | North America and northern South America and Caribbean | Size range: 5–9 cm (2–4 in) long, plus 3–6 cm (1–2 in) tail (both) Habitats: Rocky areas, caves, and forest Diets: {{{hunting}}} |
| Euderma | H. Allen, 1892 One species: E. maculatum (Spotted bat) | Western North America | Size: 6–7 cm (2–3 in) long, plus 4–5 cm (2–2 in) tail Habitats: Forest, caves, and desert |
| Falsistrellus (false pipistrelle) | Troughton, 1943 Two species: F. mackenziei (Western false pipistrelle); F. tasmaniensis (Eastern false pipistrelle) | Australia | Size range: 5–7 cm (2–3 in) long, plus 4–6 cm (2–2 in) tail (multiple) Habitat: Forest |
| Glauconycteris (butterfly bat) | Dobson, 1875 Fifteen species: G. alboguttata (Allen's striped bat); G. argentata (Silvered bat); G. atra (Black butterfly bat); G. baka (Baka butterfly bat); G. beatrix (Beatrix's bat); G. curryae (Curry's bat); G. egeria (Bibundi bat); G. gleni (Glen's wattled bat); G. humeralis (Allen's spotted bat); G. kenyacola (Kenyan wattled bat); G. lobeke (Lobéké butterfly bat); G. machadoi (Machado's butterfly bat); G. poensis (Abo bat); G. superba (Pied butterfly bat, pictured); G. variegata (Variegated butterfly bat) | Sub-Saharan Africa | Size range: 3 cm (1 in) long, plus 3 cm (1 in) tail (Allen's spotted bat) to 7 cm (3 in) long, plus 5 cm (2 in) tail (pied butterfly bat) Habitats: Shrubland, savanna, and forest |
| Glischropus (thick-thumbed bat) | Dobson, 1875 Five species: G. aquilus (Dark thick-thumbed bat); G. bucephalus (Indochinese thick-thumbed bat); G. javanus (Javan thick-thumbed bat); G. meghalayanus (Meghalaya thick-thumbed bat); G. tylopus (Common thick-thumbed bat, pictured) | Southeastern Asia | Size range: 4 cm (2 in) long, plus 3 cm (1 in) tail (common thick-thumbed bat) to 5 cm (2 in) long, plus 5 cm (2 in) tail (Indochinese thick-thumbed bat) Habitat: Forest |
| Hesperoptenus (false serotine) | Peters, 1868 Five species: H. blanfordi (Blanford's bat); H. doriae (False serotine bat); H. gaskelli (Gaskell's false serotine); H. tickelli (Tickell's bat, pictured); H. tomesi (Large false serotine) | Southern and southeastern Asia | Size range: 3 cm (1 in) long, plus 3 cm (1 in) tail (Blanford's bat) to 8 cm (3 in) long, plus 7 cm (3 in) tail (Tickell's bat) Habitats: Forest and caves |
| Histiotus (big-eared brown bat) | Gervais, 1856 Eleven species: H. alienus (Strange big-eared brown bat); H. cadenai (Cadena's big-eared brown bat); H. colombiae (Colombian big-eared brown bat); H. diaphanopterus (Transparent-winged big-eared brown bat); H. humboldti (Humboldt big-eared brown bat); H. laephotis (Thomas's big-eared brown bat); H. macrotus (Big-eared brown bat); H. magellanicus (Southern big-eared brown bat); H. mochica (Moche's big-eared brown bat); H. montanus (Small big-eared brown bat, pictured); H. velatus (Tropical big-eared brown bat) | South America | Size range: 5 cm (2 in) long, plus 4 cm (2 in) tail (big-eared brown bat) to 8 cm (3 in) long, plus 6 cm (2 in) tail (tropical big-eared brown bat) Habitats: Forest and caves (some species unknown) |
| Hypsugo (Asian pipistrelle) | Kolenati, 1856 Sixteen species: H. affinis (Chocolate pipistrelle); H. alaschanicus (Alashanian pipistrelle); H. arabicus (Arabian pipistrelle); H. ariel (Desert pipistrelle); H. cadornae (Cadorna's pipistrelle); H. dolichodon (Long-toothed pipistrelle); H. imbricatus (Brown pipistrelle); H. kitcheneri (Red-brown pipistrelle); H. lanzai (Socotran pipistrelle); H. lophurus (Burma pipistrelle); H. macrotis (Big-eared pipistrelle); H. mordax (Pungent pipistrelle); H. petersi (Peters's pipistrelle); H. pulveratus (Chinese pipistrelle); H. savii (Savi's pipistrelle, pictured); H. vordermanni (Vordermann's pipistrelle) | Europe, northern Africa, and Asia | Size range: 3 cm (1 in) long, plus 3 cm (1 in) tail (Alashanian pipistrelle) to 6 cm (2 in) long, plus 4 cm (2 in) tail (red-brown pipistrelle) Habitats: Savanna, shrubland, forest, caves, desert, grassland, rocky areas, and inland wetlands |
| Ia | Thomas, 1902 One species: I. io (Great evening bat) | Eastern Asia | Size: 8–11 cm (3–4 in) long, plus 4–9 cm (2–4 in) tail Habitats: Forest and caves |
| Idionycteris | Anthony, 1923 One species: I. phyllotis (Allen's big-eared bat) | Western United States and Mexico | Size: About 7 cm (3 in), plus 4–6 cm (2 in) tail Habitats: Forest, caves, and desert |
| Laephotis (African long-eared bat) | Thomas, 1901 Nine species: L. angolensis (Angolan long-eared bat); L. capensis (Cape serotine, pictured); L. kirinyaga (East African serotine); L. malagasyensis (Isalo serotine); L. matroka (Malagasy serotine); L. namibensis (Namib long-eared bat); L. robertsi (Roberts's serotine); L. stanleyi (Stanley's serotine); L. wintoni (De Winton's long-eared bat) | Africa | Size range: 4 cm (2 in) long, plus 3 cm (1 in) tail (Angolan long-eared bat) to 7 cm (3 in) long, plus 5 cm (2 in) tail (De Winton's long-eared bat) Habitats: Savanna, shrubland, desert, grassland, and inland wetlands |
| Lasionycteris | Peters, 1866 One species: L. noctivagans (Silver-haired bat) | North America | Size: 5–7 cm (2–3 in) long, plus 3–5 cm (1–2 in) tail Habitats: Forest, rocky areas, and caves |
| Lasiurus (red bat) | J. E. Gray, 1831 Twenty species: L. arequipae (Arequipa cinnamon red bat); L. atratus (Greater red bat); L. blossevillii (Southern red bat); L. borealis (Eastern red bat); L. castaneus (Tacarcuna bat); L. cinereus (Hoary bat, pictured); L. degelidus (Jamaican red bat); L. ebenus (Hairy-tailed bat); L. ega (Southern yellow bat); L. egregius (Big red bat); L. frantzii (Western red bat); L. insularis (Cuban yellow bat); L. intermedius (Northern yellow bat); L. minor (Minor red bat); L. pfeifferi (Pfeiffer's red bat); L. seminolus (Seminole bat); L. semotus (Hawaiian hoary bat); L. varius (Cinnamon red bat); L. villosissimus (Hairy hoary bat); L. xanthinus (Western yellow bat) | North and South America | Size range: 4 cm (2 in) long, plus 3 cm (1 in) tail (minor red bat) to 9 cm (4 in) long, plus 9 cm (4 in) tail (Cuban yellow bat) Habitats: Savanna, shrubland, forest, and caves |
| Mimetillus | Thomas, 1904 One species: M. moloneyi (Moloney's mimic bat) | Sub-Saharan Africa | Size: 5–7 cm (2–3 in) long, plus 2–4 cm (1–2 in) tail Habitats: Forest and savanna |
| Mirostrellus | Görföl, Kruskop, Tu, Estók, Son, & Csorba, 2020 One species: M. joffrei (Joffre's bat) | Myanmar | Size: About 6 cm (2 in), plus 3–5 cm (1–2 in) tail Habitats: Forest Diet: {{{hunting}}} |
| Neoeptesicus | Cláudio, Novaes, Gardner, Nogueira, Wilson, Maldonado, Oliveira, & Moratelli, 2023 Ten species: N. andinus (Little black serotine); N. brasiliensis (Brazilian brown bat); N. chiriquinus (Chiriquinan serotine); N. diminutus (Diminutive serotine, pictured); N. furinalis (Argentine brown bat); N. innoxius (Harmless serotine); N. langeri (Langer's serotine); N. orinocensis (Orinoco serotine); N. taddeii (Taddei's serotine); N. ulapesensis (Ulapes serotine) | Mexico, Central America, and South America | Size range: 4 cm (2 in) long, plus 3 cm (1 in) tail (Argentine brown bat) to 7 cm (3 in) long, plus 6 cm (2 in) tail (Chiriquinan serotine) Habitats: Unknown and forest Diets: {{{hunting}}} |
| Neoromicia (serotine) | Roberts, 1926 Six species: N. anchietae (Anchieta's serotine); N. bemainty (Kirindy serotine); N. guineensis (Tiny serotine); N. hlandzeni (Lowveld serotine); N. somalica (Somali serotine, pictured); N. zuluensis (Zulu serotine) | Sub-Saharan Africa | Size range: 3 cm (1 in) long, plus 2 cm (1 in) tail (Somali serotine) to 6 cm (2 in) long, plus 4 cm (2 in) tail (Somali serotine) Habitats: Savanna, shrubland, forest, desert, grassland, and inland wetlands |
| Nyctalus (noctule bat) | Bowdich, 1825 Eight species: N. aviator (Birdlike noctule); N. azoreum (Azores noctule); N. furvus (Japanese noctule); N. lasiopterus (Greater noctule bat); N. leisleri (Lesser noctule, pictured); N. montanus (Mountain noctule); N. noctula (Common noctule); N. plancyi (Chinese noctule) | Europe, northern Africa, and Asia | Size range: 4 cm (2 in) long, plus 3 cm (1 in) tail (Lesser noctule) to 11 cm (4 in) long, plus 7 cm (3 in) tail (Birdlike noctule) Habitats: Shrubland, forest, caves, rocky areas, and inland wetlands |
| Nycticeinops | Hill & Harrison, 1987 Three species: N. eisentrauti (Eisentraut's serotine); N. macrocephalus (Big-headed serotine); N. schlieffeni (Schlieffen's serotine, pictured) | Africa | Size: 3 cm (1 in) long, plus 2 cm (1 in) tail (Schlieffen's serotine) to 5 cm (2 in) long, plus 4 cm (2 in) tail (Schlieffen's serotine) Habitats: Desert, shrubland, savanna, and forest |
| Nycticeius (evening bat) | Rafinesque, 1819 Three species: N. aenobarbus (Temminck's mysterious bat); N. cubanus (Cuban evening bat); N. humeralis (Evening bat, pictured) | Western Cuba, South America, and southern North America | Size range: 4 cm (2 in) long, plus 2 cm (1 in) tail (Temminck's mysterious bat) to 6 cm (2 in) long, plus 5 cm (2 in) tail (evening bat) Habitat: Forest |
| Nyctophilus (Australian big-eared bat) | Leach, 1821 17 species (one extinct): N. arnhemensis (Arnhem long-eared bat); N. bifax (Eastern long-eared bat); N. corbeni (Southeastern long-eared bat); N. daedalus (Pallid long-eared bat); N. geoffroyi (Lesser long-eared bat, pictured); N. gouldi (Gould's long-eared bat); N. heran (Sunda long-eared bat); N. holtorum (Holts' long-eared bat); N. howensis (Lord Howe long-eared bat)†; N. major (Western long-eared bat); N. microdon (Small-toothed long-eared bat); N. microtis (New Guinea long-eared bat); N. nebulosus (New Caledonian long-eared bat); N. sherrini (Tasmanian long-eared bat); N. shirleyae (Mount Missim long-eared bat); N. timoriensis (Greater long-eared bat); N. walkeri (Pygmy long-eared bat) | Australia and southeastern Asia | Size range: 3 cm (1 in) long, plus 3 cm (1 in) tail (eastern long-eared bat) to 8 cm (3 in) long, plus 6 cm (2 in) tail (greater long-eared bat) Habitats: Savanna, shrubland, forest, caves, grassland, and inland wetlands |
| Otonycteris (long-eared bat) | Peters, 1859 Two species: O. hemprichii (Desert long-eared bat, pictured); O. leucophaea (Turkestani long-eared bat) | Western Asia and northern Africa | Size range: 5–9 cm (2–4 in) long, plus 4–7 cm (2–3 in) tail (desert long-eared bat) Habitats: Grassland, shrubland, rocky areas, and desert |
| Parastrellus | Hoofer, Van Den Bussche, & Horáček, 2006 One species: P. hesperus (Canyon bat) | Western United States and Mexico (in red) | Size: 3–6 cm (1–2 in) long, plus 2–4 cm (1–2 in) tail Habitats: Forest, grassland, rocky areas, caves, and desert |
| Perimyotis | Menu, 1984 One species: P. subflavus (Tricolored bat) | Eastern North America (in yellow) | Size: 4–5 cm (2–2 in) long, plus 3–5 cm (1–2 in) tail Habitats: Forest, rocky areas, and caves |
| Pharotis | Thomas, 1914 One species: P. imogene (New Guinea big-eared bat) | Papua New Guinea | Size: 4–5 cm (2–2 in) long, plus 4–5 cm (2–2 in) tail Habitat: Forest |
| Philetor | Thomas, 1902 One species: P. brachypterus (Rohu's bat) | Southeastern Asia | Size: 5–7 cm (2–3 in) long, plus 3–4 cm (1–2 in) tail Habitats: Forest and grassland |
| Pipistrellus (pipistrelle) | Kaup, 1829 Sixteen species: P. aero (Mount Gargues pipistrelle); P. creticus (Crete pipistrelle); P. etula (Bioko pipistrelle); P. hanaki (Hanak's pipistrelle); P. hesperidus (Dusky pipistrelle); P. inexspectatus (Aellen's pipistrelle); P. kuhlii (Kuhl's pipistrelle); P. maderensis (Madeira pipistrelle); P. nanulus (Tiny pipistrelle); P. nathusii (Nathusius's pipistrelle); P. permixtus (Dar es Salaam pipistrelle); P. pipistrellus (Common pipistrelle); P. pygmaeus (Soprano pipistrelle, pictured); P. raceyi (Racey's pipistrelle); P. rusticus (Rusty pipistrelle); P. simandouensis (Simandou pipistrelle) | Australia, Africa, Europe, and Asia | Size range: 3 cm (1 in) long, plus 2 cm (1 in) tail (common pipistrelle) to 6 cm (2 in) long, plus 5 cm (2 in) tail (dusky pipistrelle) Habitats: Savanna, shrubland, forest, caves, desert, rocky areas, grassland, intertidal marine, and inland wetlands |
| Plecotus (lump-nosed bat) | Geoffroy, 1818 Eighteen species: P. auritus (Brown long-eared bat); P. austriacus (Grey long-eared bat); P. balensis (Ethiopian long-eared bat); P. christii (Christie's long-eared bat); P. gaisleri (Gaisler's long-eared bat); P. gobiensis (Gobi long-eared bat); P. homochrous (Himalayan long-eared bat); P. kolombatovici (Mediterranean long-eared bat); P. kozlovi (Kozlov's long-eared bat); P. macrobullaris (Alpine long-eared bat); P. ognevi (Ognev's long-eared bat); P. sacrimontis (Japanese long-eared bat); P. sardus (Sardinian long-eared bat, pictured); P. strelkovi (Strelkov's long-eared bat); P. taivanus (Taiwan long-eared bat); P. teneriffae (Canary long-eared bat); P. turkmenicus (Turkmen long-eared bat); P. wardi (Ward's long-eared bat) | Europe, Asia, and northern Africa | Size range: 3 cm (1 in) long, plus 3 cm (1 in) tail (brown long-eared bat) to 6 cm (2 in) long, plus 6 cm (2 in) tail (alpine long-eared bat) Habitats: Savanna, shrubland, forest, caves, desert, grassland, and rocky areas |
| Pseudoromicia | Monadjem, Patterson, Webala, & Demos, 2020 Nine species: P. brunnea (Dark-brown serotine); P. isabella (Isabelline white-winged serotine); P. kityoi (Kityo's serotine); P. mbamminkom (Mbam Minkom serotine); P. nyanza (Nyanza serotine); P. principis (Príncipe's serotine); P. rendalli (Rendall's serotine, pictured); P. roseveari (Rosevear's serotine); P. tenuipinnis (White-winged serotine) | Sub-Saharan Africa | Size range: 3 cm (1 in) long, plus 2 cm (1 in) tail (Mbam Minkom serotine) to 7 cm (3 in) long, plus 5 cm (2 in) tail (Rendall's serotine) Habitats: Shrubland, savanna, and forest Diets: {{{hunting}}} |
| Rhogeessa (yellow bat) | H. Allen, 1866 Twelve species: R. aenea (Yucatan yellow bat, pictured); R. bickhami (Bickham's little yellow bat); R. genowaysi (Genoways's yellow bat); R. hussoni (Husson's yellow bat); R. io (Thomas's yellow bat); R. menchuae (Menchu's little yellow bat); R. minutilla (Tiny yellow bat); R. mira (Least yellow bat); R. parvula (Little yellow bat); R. permutandis (Nicaraguan little yellow bat); R. tumida (Black-winged little yellow bat); R. velilla (Ecuadorian little yellow bat) | Mexico, Central America, and South America | Size range: 3 cm (1 in) long, plus 2 cm (1 in) tail (black-winged little yellow bat) to 5 cm (2 in) long, plus 4 cm (2 in) tail (Bickham's little yellow bat) Habitats: Shrubland and forest |
| Rhyneptesicus | Bianchi, 1917 One species: R. nasutus (Sind bat) | Western Asia | Size: 4–6 cm (2–2 in) long, plus 3–5 cm (1–2 in) tail Habitats: Forest, savanna, caves, and desert |
| Scoteanax | Troughton, 1944 One species: S. rueppellii (Rüppell's broad-nosed bat) | Eastern Mexico | Size: 6–8 cm (2–3 in) long, plus 4–6 cm (2–2 in) tail Habitat: Forest |
| Scotoecus (lesser house bat) | Thomas, 1901 Five species: S. albigula (White-bellied lesser house bat); S. albofuscus (Light-winged lesser house bat); S. hindei (Hinde's lesser house bat); S. hirundo (Dark-winged lesser house bat); S. pallidus (Desert yellow bat) | Sub-Saharan Africa and southern Asia | Size range: 4–6 cm (2–2 in) long, plus 2–5 cm (1–2 in) tail (multiple) Habitats: Shrubland, savanna, and forest |
| Scotomanes | Dobson, 1875 One species: S. ornatus (Harlequin bat) | Eastern and southeastern Asia | Size: 6–9 cm (2–4 in) long, plus 5–7 cm (2–3 in) tail Habitats: Forest and caves |
| Scotophilus (Old World yellow bat) | Leach, 1821 Twenty species: S. altilis (Lesser brown bat); S. andrewreborii (Andrew Rebori's house bat); S. borbonicus (Lesser yellow bat); S. colias (Eritrean yellow bat); S. collinus (Sody's yellow bat); S. dinganii (African yellow bat, pictured); S. ejetai (Ejeta's yellow bat); S. heathii (Greater Asiatic yellow bat); S. kuhlii (Lesser Asiatic yellow bat); S. leucogaster (White-bellied yellow bat); S. livingstonii (Livingstone's yellow bat); S. marovaza (Marovaza yellow bat); S. nigrita (Schreber's yellow bat); S. nucella (Robbins's yellow bat); S. nux (Nut-colored yellow bat); S. robustus (Robust yellow bat); S. tandrefana (Malagasy yellow bat); S. trujilloi (Trujillo's yellow bat); S. viridis (Eastern greenish yellow bat); S. viridis (Western greenish yellow bat) | Southern and southeastern Asia and Sub-Saharan Africa | Size range: 5 cm (2 in) long, plus 3 cm (1 in) tail (lesser Asiatic yellow bat) to 13 cm (5 in) long, plus 10 cm (4 in) tail (Schreber's yellow bat) Habitats: Savanna, shrubland, forest, desert, and grassland (some species unknown) |
| Scotorepens (broad-nosed bat) | Troughton, 1943 Four species: S. balstoni (Inland broad-nosed bat, pictured); S. greyii (Little broad-nosed bat); S. orion (Eastern broad-nosed bat); S. sanborni (Northern broad-nosed bat) | Australia, Timor-Leste, and Papua New Guinea | Size range: 3 cm (1 in) long, plus 2 cm (1 in) tail (little broad-nosed bat) to 6 cm (2 in) long, plus 4 cm (2 in) tail (eastern broad-nosed bat) Habitats: Savanna, shrubland, forest, desert, and grassland |
| Scotozous | Dobson, 1875 One species: S. dormeri (Dormer's bat) | Southern Asia | Size: 3–6 cm (1–2 in) long, plus 2–5 cm (1–2 in) tail Habitats: Forest, shrubland, and desert |
| Tylonycteris (bamboo bat) | Peters, 1872 Six species: T. fulvida (Amber bamboo bat); T. malayana (Malayan bamboo bat); T. pachypus (Lesser bamboo bat, pictured); T. pygmaea (Pygmy bamboo bat); T. robustula (Greater bamboo bat); T. tonkinensis (Tonkin bamboo bat) | Southeastern Asia | Size range: 2 cm (1 in) long, plus 2 cm (1 in) tail (pygmy bamboo bat) to 5 cm (2 in) long, plus 4 cm (2 in) tail (greater bamboo bat) Habitat: Forest |
| Vansonia | Roberts, 1946 One species: V. rueppellii (Rüppell's bat) | Africa and southwestern Asia | Size: 4–6 cm (2 in), plus 2–5 cm (1–2 in) tail Habitats: Desert, shrubland, and savanna |
| Vespadelus (forest bat) | Troughton, 1943 Nine species: V. baverstocki (Inland forest bat); V. caurinus (Northern cave bat); V. darlingtoni (Large forest bat); V. douglasorum (Yellow-lipped bat); V. finlaysoni (Finlayson's cave bat); V. pumilus (Eastern forest bat); V. regulus (Southern forest bat); V. troughtoni (Eastern cave bat); V. vulturnus (Little forest bat, pictured) | Australia | Size range: 3 cm (1 in) long, plus 3 cm (1 in) tail (eastern cave bat) to 6 cm (2 in) long, plus 4 cm (2 in) tail (large forest bat) Habitats: Savanna, shrubland, forest, caves, desert, and grassland |
| Vespertilio (parti-coloured bat) | Linnaeus, 1758 Two species: V. murinus (Parti-coloured bat, pictured); V. sinensis (Asian particolored bat) | Europe and Asia | Size range: 4 cm (2 in) long, plus 3 cm (1 in) tail (parti-coloured bat) to 8 cm (3 in) long, plus 6 cm (2 in) tail (Asian particolored bat) Habitats: Shrubland, coastal marine, forest, caves, desert, rocky areas, grassland, and inland wetlands |

=== Suborder Yinpterochiroptera ===
==== Superfamily Pteropodoidea ====
===== Family Pteropodidae =====
Members of the Pteropodidae family are called pteropodids, or colloquially fruit bats, flying foxes, or megabats. Most species primarily or exclusively eat fruit, though the species of the subfamily Macroglossusinae primarily eat pollen and nectar and many of the species of the subfamily Nyctimeninae sometimes eat insects. Pteropodidae comprises 198 extant species, divided into 46 genera. These genera are grouped into seven subfamilies: Eidolinae, Harpyionycterinae, Nyctimeninae, Pteropodinae, Rousettinae, and Macroglossusinae. Pteropodinae additionally contains six species which have been made extinct since 1500 CE.

Subfamily Cynopterinae – K. Andersen, 1912 – 14 genera
| Name | Authority and species | Range | Size and ecology |
|---|---|---|---|
| Aethalops (sooty bat) | Thomas, 1923 Two species: A. aequalis (Borneo fruit bat, pictured); A. alecto (Pygmy fruit bat) | Southeastern Asia | Size range: 5 cm (2 in) long, with no tail (Borneo fruit bat) to 8 cm (3 in) long, with no tail (pygmy fruit bat) Habitats: Forest and caves |
| Alionycteris | Kock, 1969 One species: A. paucidentata (Mindanao pygmy fruit bat) | Philippines | Size: 6–8 cm (2–3 in) long, with no tail Habitat: Forest |
| Balionycteris (spotted-winged fruit bat) | Matschie, 1899 Two species: B. maculata (Spotted-winged fruit bat, pictured); B. seimundi (Malayan spotted-winged fruit bat) | Southeastern Asia and Malaysia | Size range: 5 cm (2 in) long, with no tail (Malayan spotted-winged fruit bat) to 8 cm (3 in) long, with no tail (spotted-winged fruit bat) Habitat: Forest |
| Chironax (black-capped fruit bat) | K. Andersen, 1912 Two species: C. melanocephalus (Black-capped fruit bat, pictured); C. tumulus (Sulawesi black-capped fruit bat) | Southeastern Asia | Size: 5–8 cm (2–3 in) long, with no tail Habitats: Forest and caves |
| Cynopterus (short-nosed fruit bat) | F. Cuvier, 1824 Seven species: C. brachyotis (Lesser short-nosed fruit bat, pictured); C. horsfieldii (Horsfield's fruit bat); C. luzoniensis (Peters's fruit bat); C. minutus (Minute fruit bat); C. nusatenggara (Nusatenggara short-nosed fruit bat); C. sphinx (Greater short-nosed fruit bat); C. titthaecheilus (Indonesian short-nosed fruit bat) | Southern and southeastern Asia | Size range: 7 cm (3 in) long, plus 1 cm (0.4 in) tail (lesser short-nosed fruit bat) to 13 cm (5 in) long, plus 2 cm (1 in) tail (Indonesian short-nosed fruit bat) Habitats: Forest and caves |
| Dyacopterus (dyak fruit bat) | K. Andersen, 1912 Three species: D. brooksi (Brooks's dyak fruit bat); D. rickarti (Rickart's dyak fruit bat); D. spadiceus (Dayak fruit bat) | Southeastern Asia | Size range: 10 cm (4 in) long, plus 1 cm (0.4 in) tail (dayak fruit bat) to 15 cm (6 in) long, plus 3 cm (1 in) tail (Rickart's dyak fruit bat) Habitats: Forest and caves |
| Haplonycteris | Lawrence, 1939 One species: H. fischeri (Fischer's pygmy fruit bat) | Philippines | Size: 6–8 cm (2–3 in) long, with no tail Habitat: Forest |
| Latidens | Thonglongya, 1972 One species: L. salimalii (Salim Ali's fruit bat) | Southern India | Size: 10–11 cm (4–4 in) long, with no tail Habitats: Forest and caves |
| Megaerops (tailless fruit bat) | Peters, 1865 Four species: M. albicollis (White-collared fruit bat); M. ecaudatus (Tailless fruit bat, pictured); M. kusnotoi (Javan tailless fruit bat); M. niphanae (Ratanaworabhan's fruit bat) | Southeastern Asia | Size range: 5 cm (2 in) long, with no tail (Javan tailless fruit bat) to 9 cm (4 in) long, with no tail (Ratanaworabhan's fruit bat) Habitat: Forest |
| Otopteropus | Kock, 1969 One species: O. cartilagonodus (Luzon fruit bat) | Philippines | Size: 6–8 cm (2–3 in) long, with no tail Habitat: Forest |
| Penthetor | K. Andersen, 1912 One species: P. lucasi (Dusky fruit bat) | Southeastern Asia | Size: 7–11 cm (3–4 in) long, plus 0.5–2 cm (0.2–0.8 in) tail Habitats: Forest and caves |
| Ptenochirus (musky fruit bat) | Peters, 1861 Three species: P. jagori (Greater musky fruit bat, pictured); P. minor (Lesser musky fruit bat); P. wetmorei (White-collared fruit bat) | Philippines | Size range: 10 cm (4 in) long, plus 0.5 cm (0.2 in) tail (lesser musky fruit bat) to 13 cm (5 in) long, plus 2 cm (1 in) tail (greater musky fruit bat) Habitat: Forest |
| Sphaerias | Miller, 1906 One species: S. blanfordi (Blanford's fruit bat) | Southern and southeastern Asia | Size: 7–9 cm (3–4 in) long, with no tail Habitat: Forest |
| Thoopterus (swift fruit bat) | Matschie, 1899 Two species: T. nigrescens (Swift fruit bat); T. suhaniahae (Suhaniah fruit bat) | Indonesia | Size range: 8 cm (3 in) long, with no tail (Suhaniah fruit bat) to 12 cm (5 in) long, plus 0.5 cm (0.2 in) tail (swift fruit bat) Habitat: Forest |

Subfamily Eidolinae – Almeida, Giannini, & Simmons, 2016 – one genus
| Name | Authority and species | Range | Size and ecology |
|---|---|---|---|
| Eidolon | Rafinesque, 1815 Two species: E. dupreanum (Madagascan fruit bat); E. helvum (Straw-coloured fruit bat, pictured) | Sub-Saharan Africa and western Arabian Peninsula | Size range: 15 cm (6 in) long, with no tail (straw-coloured fruit bat) to 21 cm (8 in) long, with no tail (Madagascan fruit bat) Habitats: Savanna, forest, and caves |

Subfamily Harpyionycterinae – Miller, 1907 – four genera
| Name | Authority and species | Range | Size and ecology |
|---|---|---|---|
| Aproteles | Menzies, 1977 One species: A. bulmerae (Bulmer's fruit bat) | New Guinea | Size: About 25 cm (10 in) long, with no tail Habitats: Forest and caves |
| Boneia | Jentink, 1879 One species: B. bidens (Manado fruit bat) | Indonesia | Size: About 19 cm (7 in) long, with no tail Habitats: Forest and caves |
| Dobsonia (naked-backed fruit bat) | Palmer, 1898 14 species: D. anderseni (Andersen's naked-backed fruit bat); D. beauforti (Beaufort's naked-backed fruit bat); D. chapmani (Philippine naked-backed fruit bat); D. crenulata (Halmahera naked-backed fruit bat); D. emersa (Biak naked-backed fruit bat); D. exoleta (Sulawesi naked-backed fruit bat); D. inermis (Solomon's naked-backed fruit bat); D. magna (New Guinea naked-backed fruit bat); D. minor (Lesser naked-backed fruit bat); D. moluccensis (Bare-backed fruit bat, pictured); D. pannietensis (Panniet naked-backed fruit bat); D. peronii (Western naked-backed fruit bat); D. praedatrix (New Britain naked-backed fruit bat); D. viridis (Greenish naked-backed fruit bat) | Southeastern Asia and northern Australia | Size range: 10 cm (4 in) long, plus 0.5 cm (0.2 in) tail (lesser naked-backed fruit bat) to 25 cm (10 in) long, plus 5 cm (2 in) tail (bare-backed fruit bat) Habitats: Rocky areas, forest, and caves |
| Harpyionycteris (harpy fruit bat) | Thomas, 1896 Two species: H. celebensis (Sulawesi harpy fruit bat); H. whiteheadi (Harpy fruit bat, pictured) | Indonesia and Philippines | Size range: 11 cm (4 in) long, with no tail (Sulawesi harpy fruit bat) to 16 cm (6 in) long, with no tail (harpy fruit bat) Habitats: Forest |

Subfamily Nyctimeninae – Miller, 1907 – two genera
| Name | Authority and species | Range | Size and ecology |
|---|---|---|---|
| Nyctimene (tube-nosed fruit bat) | Borkhausen, 1797 16 species: N. aello (Broad-striped tube-nosed fruit bat); N. albiventer (Common tube-nosed fruit bat); N. cephalotes (Pallas's tube-nosed bat); N. certans (Mountain tube-nosed fruit bat); N. cyclotis (Round-eared tube-nosed fruit bat); N. draconilla (Dragon tube-nosed fruit bat); N. keasti (Keast's tube-nosed fruit bat); N. major (Island tube-nosed fruit bat); N. malaitensis (Malaita tube-nosed fruit bat); N. masalai (Demonic tube-nosed fruit bat); N. rabori (Philippine tube-nosed fruit bat); N. robinsoni (Eastern tube-nosed bat, pictured); N. sanctacrucis (Nendo tube-nosed fruit bat); N. varius (Lesser tube-nosed bat); N. vizcaccia (Umboi tube-nosed fruit bat); N. wrightae (New Guinea tube-nosed bat) | Southeastern Asia | Size range: 6 cm (2 in) long, with no tail (Keast's tube-nosed fruit bat) to 15 cm (6 in) long, with no tail (broad-striped tube-nosed fruit bat) Habitats: Savanna, forest, and inland wetlands |
| Paranyctimene (lesser tube-nosed fruit bat) | Tate, 1942 Two species: P. raptor (Lesser tube-nosed fruit bat); P. tenax (Steadfast tube-nosed fruit bat) | New Guinea and Indonesia | Size range: 6–10 cm (2–4 in) long, plus 1–3 cm (0.4–1.2 in) tail (multiple) Habitat: Forest |

Subfamily Pteropodinae – J. E. Gray, 1821 – seven genera
| Name | Authority and species | Range | Size and ecology |
|---|---|---|---|
| Acerodon (sharp-toothed flying fox) | Jourdan, 1837 Five species: A. celebensis (Sulawesi flying fox, pictured); A. humilis (Talaud flying fox); A. jubatus (Giant golden-crowned flying fox); A. leucotis (Palawan fruit bat); A. mackloti (Sunda flying fox) | Indonesia and Philippines | Size range: 19 cm (7 in) long, with no tail (Sulawesi flying fox) to 30 cm (12 in) long, with no tail (Giant golden-crowned flying fox) Habitat: Forest |
| Desmalopex (white-winged flying fox) | Miller, 1907 Two species: D. leucoptera (White-winged flying fox, pictured); D. microleucoptera (Small white-winged flying fox) | Philippines | Size range: 13 cm (5 in) long, with no tail (small white-winged flying fox) to 24 cm (9 in) long, with no tail (white-winged flying fox) Habitats: Grassland and forest |
| Mirimiri | Helgen, 2005 One species: M. acrodonta (Fijian monkey-faced bat) | Fiji | Size: 17–20 cm (7–8 in) long, with no tail Habitat: Forest |
| Neopteryx | Hayman, 1946 One species: N. frosti (Small-toothed fruit bat) | Indonesia | Size: About 16 cm (6 in), with no tail Habitat: Forest |
| Pteralopex (monkey-faced bat) | Thomas, 1888 Five species: P. anceps (Bougainville monkey-faced bat, pictured); P. atrata (Guadalcanal monkey-faced bat); P. flanneryi (Greater monkey-faced bat); P. pulchra (Montane monkey-faced bat); P. taki (New Georgian monkey-faced bat) | Solomon Islands | Size range: 16 cm (6 in) long, with no tail (montane monkey-faced bat) to 28 cm (11 in) long (Bougainville monkey-faced bat) Habitat: Forest |
| Pteropus (flying fox) | Brisson, 1762 72 species (6 extinct): P. admiralitatum (Admiralty flying fox); P. aldabrensis (Aldabra flying fox); P. alecto (Black flying fox); P. allenorum (Small Samoan flying fox)†; P. anetianus (Vanuatu flying fox); P. aruensis (Aru flying fox); P. brunneus (Percy Island flying fox)†; P. caniceps (Ashy-headed flying fox); P. capistratus (Bismarck masked flying fox); P. chrysoproctus (Moluccan flying fox); P. cognatus (Makira flying fox); P. comorensis (Small Comoro flying fox); P. conspicillatus (Spectacled flying fox); P. coxi (Large Samoan flying fox)†; P. dasymallus (Ryukyu flying fox); P. ennisae (New Ireland masked flying fox); P. faunulus (Nicobar flying fox); P. fundatus (Banks flying fox); P. gilliardorum (Gilliard's flying fox); P. griseus (Gray flying fox); P. howensis (Ontong Java flying fox); P. hypomelanus (Small flying fox); P. intermedius (Andersen's flying fox); P. keyensis (Kei flying fox); P. livingstonii (Livingstone's fruit bat); P. lombocensis (Lombok flying fox); P. loochoensis (Okinawa flying fox); P. lylei (Lyle's flying fox); P. macrotis (Big-eared flying fox); P. mahaganus (Lesser flying fox); P. mariannus (Mariana fruit bat); P. medius (Indian flying fox); P. melanopogon (Black-bearded flying fox); P. melanotus (Black-eared flying fox); P. molossinus (Caroline flying fox); P. neohibernicus (Great flying fox); P. niger (Mauritian flying fox); P. nitendiensis (Temotu flying fox); P. ocularis (Ceram fruit bat); P. ornatus (Ornate flying fox); P. pelagicus (Chuuk flying fox); P. pelewensis (Pelew flying fox); P. personatus (Masked flying fox); P. pilosus (Large Palau flying fox)†; P. pohlei (Geelvink Bay flying fox); P. poliocephalus (Grey-headed flying fox); P. pselaphon (Bonin flying fox); P. pumilus (Little golden-mantled flying fox); P. rayneri (Solomons flying fox); P. rennelli (Rennell flying fox); P. rodricensis (Rodrigues flying fox); P. rufus (Madagascan flying fox); P. samoensis (Samoa flying fox); P. scapulatus (Little red flying fox); P. seychellensis (Seychelles fruit bat); P. speciosus (Philippine gray flying fox); P. subniger (Small Mauritian flying fox)†; P. temminckii (Temminck's flying fox); P. tokudae (Guam flying fox)†; P. tonganus (Insular flying fox); P. tuberculatus (Vanikoro flying fox); P. ualanus (Kosrae flying fox); P. vampyrus (Large flying fox, pictured); P. vetulus (New Caledonia flying fox); P. voeltzkowi (Pemba flying fox); P. woodfordi (Dwarf flying fox) | Southern, southeastern, and eastern Asia, Australia, and Madagascar and nearby islands | Size range: 9 cm (4 in) long, with no tail (dwarf flying fox) to 37 cm (15 in) long, with no tail (great flying fox) Habitats: Savanna, shrubland, forest, caves, and inland wetlands |
| Styloctenium (stripe-faced fruit bat) | Matschie, 1899 Two species: S. mindorense (Mindoro stripe-faced fruit bat); S. wallacei (Sulawesi stripe-faced fruit bat, pictured) | Indonesia and Philippines (in red) | Size range: 14 cm (6 in) long, with no tail (Mindoro stripe-faced fruit bat) to 20 cm (8 in) long, with no tail (Sulawesi stripe-faced fruit bat) Habitat: Forest |

Subfamily Rousettinae – K. Andersen, 1912 – 13 genera
| Name | Authority and species | Range | Size and ecology |
|---|---|---|---|
| Casinycteris (short-palated bat) | Thomas, 1910 Three species: C. argynnis (Short-palated fruit bat); C. campomaanensis (Campo-Ma'an fruit bat); C. ophiodon (Pohle's fruit bat, pictured) | Central Africa | Size range: 7–10 cm (3–4 in) long, with no tail (short-palated fruit bat) Habitat: Forest |
| Eonycteris (dawn bat) | Dobson, 1873 Three species: E. major (Greater nectar bat); E. robusta (Philippine dawn bat); E. spelaea (Cave nectar bat, pictured) | Southern and southeastern Asia | Size range: 7 cm (3 in) long, plus 1 cm (0.4 in) tail (cave nectar bat) to 13 cm (5 in) long, plus 3 cm (1 in) tail (greater nectar bat) Habitats: Forest and caves |
| Epomophorus (epauletted bat) | Bennett, 1836 Eleven species: E. angolensis (Angolan epauletted fruit bat); E. anselli (Ansell's epauletted fruit bat); E. crypturus (Peters's epauletted fruit bat); E. dobsonii (Dobson's epauletted fruit bat); E. gambianus (Gambian epauletted fruit bat); E. grandis (Lesser Angolan epauletted fruit bat); E. intermedius (Hayman's dwarf epauletted fruit bat); E. labiatus (Ethiopian epauletted fruit bat); E. minor (Minor epauletted fruit bat); E. pusillus (Peters's dwarf epauletted fruit bat); E. wahlbergi (Wahlberg's epauletted fruit bat, pictured) | Sub-Saharan Africa | Size range: 6 cm (2 in) long, with no tail (Peters's dwarf epauletted fruit bat) to 19 cm (7 in) long, plus 0.1 cm (0.04 in) tail (Dobson's epauletted fruit bat) Habitats: Savanna, shrubland, forest, grassland, and rocky areas |
| Epomops (epauletted fruit bat) | J. E. Gray, 1870 Two species: E. buettikoferi (Buettikofer's epauletted fruit bat); E. franqueti (Franquet's epauletted fruit bat) | Central and western Africa | Size range: 10–20 cm (4–8 in) long, with no tail (Buettikofer's epauletted fruit bat) Habitats: Shrubland, savanna, and forest |
| Hypsignathus | H. Allen, 1861 One species: H. monstrosus (Hammer-headed bat) | Western and central Africa | Size: 16–30 cm (6–12 in) long, with no tail Habitats: Forest and savanna |
| Megaloglossus (long-tongued fruit bat) | Pagenstecher, 1885 Two species: M. azagnyi (Azagnyi fruit bat); M. woermanni (Woermann's bat, pictured) | Western and central Africa | Size range: 6 cm (2 in) long, with no tail (Woermann's fruit bat) to 9 cm (4 in) long, with no tail (Azagnyi fruit bat) Habitat: Forest |
| Myonycteris (collared fruit bat) | Matschie, 1899 Five species: M. angolensis (Angolan rousette); M. brachycephala (São Tomé collared fruit bat); M. leptodon (Sierra Leone collared fruit bat); M. relicta (East African little collared fruit bat); M. torquata (Little collared fruit bat) | Sub-Saharan Africa | Size range: 8 cm (3 in) long, with no tail (little collared fruit bat) to 14 cm (6 in) long, plus 3 cm (1 in) tail (Angolan rousette) Habitats: Savanna, shrubland, forest, caves, grassland, and rocky areas |
| Nanonycteris | Matschie, 1899 One species: N. veldkampii (Veldkamp's dwarf epauletted fruit bat) | Western Africa | Size: 6–9 cm (2–4 in) long, plus 0.1–0.5 cm (0.04–0.20 in) tail Habitats: Forest and savanna |
| Pilonycteris | Nesi, Tsang, Simmons, McGowen, & Rossiter, 2021 One species: P. celebensis (Sulawesi rousette) | Indonesia | Size: 8–11 cm (3–4 in) long, plus 2–3 cm (1–1 in) tail Habitats: Forest and caves |
| Plerotes | K. Andersen, 1910 One species: P. anchietae (D'Anchieta's fruit bat) | Southern Africa | Size: 7–10 cm (3–4 in) long, with no tail Habitats: Forest and savanna |
| Rousettus (rousette) | J. E. Gray, 1821 Seven species: R. aegyptiacus (Egyptian fruit bat, pictured); R. amplexicaudatus (Geoffroy's rousette); R. leschenaultii (Leschenault's rousette); R. linduensis (Linduan rousette); R. madagascariensis (Madagascan rousette); R. obliviosus (Comoro rousette); R. spinalatus (Bare-backed rousette) | Southern and southeastern Asia and Africa | Size range: 8 cm (3 in) long, plus 1 cm (0.4 in) tail (Leschenault's rousette) to 20 cm (8 in) long, plus 3 cm (1 in) tail (Egyptian fruit bat) Habitats: Savanna, shrubland, forest, caves, desert, grassland, and rocky areas |
| Scotonycteris (tear-drop bat) | Matschie, 1894 Three species: S. bergmansi (Bergmans's fruit bat); S. occidentalis (Hayman's fruit bat); S. zenkeri (Zenker's fruit bat, pictured) | Western Africa and Western and central Africa | Size range: 6–9 cm (2–4 in) long, with no tail (multiple) Habitat: Forest |
| Stenonycteris | Thomas, 1906 One species: S. lanosus (Long-haired fruit bat) | Eastern Africa | Size: 11–18 cm (4–7 in) long, plus 0.5–3 cm (0.2–1.2 in) tail Habitats: Forest, savanna, and shrubland |

Subfamily Macroglossusinae – Almeida, Simmons, & Giannini, 2020 – five genera
| Name | Authority and species | Range | Size and ecology |
|---|---|---|---|
| Macroglossus (long-tongued fruit bat) | F. Cuvier, 1824 Two species: M. minimus (Long-tongued nectar bat); M. sobrinus (Long-tongued fruit bat) | Southeastern Asia and northern Australia | Size range: 4 cm (2 in) long, with no tail (long-tongued nectar bat) to 9 cm (4 in) long, plus 1 cm (0.4 in) tail (long-tongued fruit bat) Habitat: Forest |
| Melonycteris | Dobson, 1877 One species: M. melanops (Black-bellied fruit bat) | Papua New Guinea | Size: 7–11 cm (3–4 in) long, with no tail Habitats: Forest and caves |
| Nesonycteris (Solomon Islands blossom bat) | Thomas, 1887 Four species: N. fardoulisi (Fardoulis's blossom bat); N. maccoyi (McCoy's blossom bat); N. mengermani (New Georgia blossom bat); N. woodfordi (Woodford's fruit bat, pictured) | Solomon Islands | Size range: 8 cm (3 in) long, with no tail (Fardoulis's blossom bat) to 11 cm (4 in) long, with no tail (Woodford's fruit bat) Habitat: Forest |
| Notopteris (long-tailed blossom bat) | J. E. Gray, 1859 Two species: N. macdonaldi (Long-tailed fruit bat); N. neocaledonica (New Caledonia blossom bat) | Fiji, Vanuatu and New Caledonia | Size range: 9 cm (4 in) long, plus 4 cm (2 in) tail (New Caledonia blossom bat) to 11 cm (4 in) long, plus 7 cm (3 in) tail (long-tailed fruit bat) Habitats: Forest and caves |
| Syconycteris (blossom bat) | Matschie, 1899 Three species: S. australis (Common blossom bat, pictured); S. carolinae (Halmahera blossom bat); S. hobbit (Moss-forest blossom bat) | Southeastern Asia and northern Australia | Size range: 5 cm (2 in) long, with no tail (common blossom bat) to 10 cm (4 in) long, with no tail (Halmahera blossom bat) Habitats: Shrubland, savanna, and forest |

==== Superfamily Rhinolophoidea ====
===== Family Craseonycteridae =====
Members of the Craseonycteridae family are called craseonycterids. The family contains a single insectivorous species.

Not assigned to a named subfamily – one genus
| Name | Authority and species | Range | Size and ecology |
|---|---|---|---|
| Craseonycteris | Hill, 1974 One species: C. thonglongyai (Kitti's hog-nosed bat) | Thailand and Myanmar | Size range: 2–4 cm (1–2 in) long, with no tail Habitats: Forest and caves |

===== Family Hipposideridae =====
Members of the Hipposideridae family are called hipposiderids, or colloquially Old World leaf-nosed bats. They are all insectivorous. Hipposideridae comprises 94 extant species, divided into 7 genera.

Not assigned to a named subfamily – seven genera
| Name | Authority and species | Range | Size and ecology |
|---|---|---|---|
| Anthops | Thomas, 1888 One species: A. ornatus (Flower-faced bat) | Papua New Guinea and the Solomon Islands | Size: 4–7 cm (2–3 in) long, plus 0.3–1 cm (0.1–0.4 in) tail Habitats: Forest and caves |
| Asellia (trident bat) | J. E. Gray, 1838 Four species: A. arabica (Arabian trident bat); A. italosomalica (Somalian trident bat); A. patrizii (Patrizi's trident leaf-nosed bat); A. tridens (Trident bat, pictured) | Northern and eastern Africa and Western Asia | Size range: 4 cm (2 in) long, plus 1 cm (0.4 in) tail (Patrizi's trident leaf-nosed bat) to 6 cm (2 in) long, plus 3 cm (1 in) tail (multiple) Habitats: Shrubland, forest, grassland, savanna, caves, and desert |
| Aselliscus (trident bats) | Tate, 1941 Three species: A. dongbacanus (Dong Bac's trident bat); A. stoliczkanus (Stoliczka's trident bat, pictured); A. tricuspidatus (Temminck's trident bat) | Southeastern Asia | Size range: 3 cm (1 in) long, plus 1 cm (0 in) tail (Temminck's trident bat) to 5 cm (2 in) long, plus 5 cm (2 in) tail (Stoliczka's trident bat) Habitats: Caves and forest |
| Coelops (tailless leaf-nosed bat) | Blyth, 1848 Three species: C. frithii (East Asian tailless leaf-nosed bat, pictured); C. hirsutus (Philippine tailless leaf-nosed bat); C. robinsoni (Malayan tailless leaf-nosed bat) | Southeastern Asia | Size range: 3 cm (1 in) long, with no tail (Malayan tailless leaf-nosed bat) to 5 cm (2 in) long, with no tail (East Asian tailless leaf-nosed bat) Habitats: Caves and forest |
| Doryrhina (roundleaf bat) | Peters, 1871 Two species: D. camerunensis (Greater roundleaf bat); D. cyclops (Cyclops roundleaf bat, pictured) | Central and western Africa | Size range: 7 cm (3 in) long, plus 1 cm (0.4 in) tail (cyclops roundleaf bat) to 10 cm (4 in) long, plus 5 cm (2 in) tail (greater roundleaf bat) Habitats: Savanna and forest |
| Hipposideros (roundleaf bat) | J. E. Gray, 1831 76 species: H. abae (Aba roundleaf bat); H. alongensis (Ha Long leaf-nosed bat); H. antricola (Philippine dusky roundleaf bat); H. armiger (Great roundleaf bat); H. ater (Dusky leaf-nosed bat); H. beatus (Benito roundleaf bat); H. bicolor (Bicolored roundleaf bat); H. boeadii (Boeadi's roundleaf bat); H. brachyotus (Dobson's roundleaf bat); H. breviceps (Short-headed roundleaf bat); H. caffer (Sundevall's roundleaf bat); H. calcaratus (Spurred roundleaf bat); H. cervinus (Fawn leaf-nosed bat); H. cineraceus (Ashy roundleaf bat); H. coronatus (Large Mindanao roundleaf bat); H. corynophyllus (Telefomin roundleaf bat); H. coxi (Cox's roundleaf bat); H. crumeniferus (Timor roundleaf bat); H. curtus (Short-tailed roundleaf bat); H. demissus (Makira roundleaf bat); H. diadema (Diadem leaf-nosed bat); H. dinops (Fierce roundleaf bat); H. doriae (Borneo roundleaf bat); H. durgadasi (Khajuria's leaf-nosed bat); H. dyacorum (Dayak roundleaf bat); H. edwardshilli (Hill's roundleaf bat); H. einnaythu (House-dwelling leaf-nosed bat); H. fuliginosus (Sooty roundleaf bat); H. fulvus (Fulvus roundleaf bat); H. galeritus (Cantor's roundleaf bat); H. gentilis (Andersen's leaf-nosed bat); H. grandis (Grand roundleaf bat); H. griffini (Griffin's leaf-nosed bat); H. halophyllus (Thailand roundleaf bat); H. hypophyllus (Kolar leaf-nosed bat); H. inexpectatus (Crested roundleaf bat); H. inornatus (Arnhem leaf-nosed bat); H. jonesi (Jones's roundleaf bat); H. khaokhouayensis (Phou Khao Khouay leaf-nosed bat); H. kingstonae (Kingston's roundleaf bat); H. kunzi (Kunz's roundleaf bat); H. lamottei (Lamotte's roundleaf bat); H. lankadiva (Indian roundleaf bat); H. larvatus (Intermediate roundleaf bat); H. lekaguli (Large Asian roundleaf bat); H. lylei (Shield-faced roundleaf bat); H. macrobullatus (Big-eared roundleaf bat); H. madurae (Maduran leaf-nosed bat); H. maggietaylorae (Maggie Taylor's roundleaf bat); H. marisae (Aellen's roundleaf bat); H. megalotis (Ethiopian large-eared roundleaf bat); H. muscinus (Fly River roundleaf bat); H. nequam (Malayan roundleaf bat); H. nicobarulae (Nicobar leaf-nosed bat); H. obscurus (Philippine forest roundleaf bat); H. orbiculus (Orbiculus leaf-nosed bat); H. papua (Biak roundleaf bat); H. pelingensis (Peleng leaf-nosed bat); H. pendleburyi (Pendlebury's roundleaf bat); H. pomona (Pomona roundleaf bat); H. poutensis (Allen's roundleaf bat); H. pygmaeus (Philippine pygmy roundleaf bat); H. ridleyi (Ridley's leaf-nosed bat); H. rotalis (Laotian leaf-nosed bat); H. ruber (Noack's roundleaf bat); H. scutinares (Shield-nosed leaf-nosed bat); H. semoni (Semon's leaf-nosed bat); H. sorenseni (Sorensen's leaf-nosed bat); H. speoris (Schneider's leaf-nosed bat); H. srilankaensis (Sri Lankan roundleaf bat); H. stenotis (Northern leaf-nosed bat); H. sumbae (Sumba roundleaf bat); H. swinhoii (Swinhoe's roundleaf bat); H. tephrus (Maghreb Leaf-nosed Bat); H. turpis (Lesser great leaf-nosed bat); H. wollastoni (Wollaston's roundleaf bat) | Southern, southeastern, and eastern Asia, Africa, southern Arabian Peninsula, and Northern Australia | Size range: 3 cm (1 in) long, plus 1 cm (0.4 in) tail (dusky leaf-nosed bat) to 11 cm (4 in) long, plus 7 cm (3 in) tail (fierce roundleaf bat) Habitats: Shrubland, forest, grassland, rocky areas, savanna, caves, and inland wetlands (some species unknown) |
| Macronycteris (leaf-nosed bat) | J. E. Gray, 1866 Five species: M. commersonii (Commerson's roundleaf bat, pictured); M. cryptovalorona (Madagascar cryptic leaf-nosed bat); M. gigas (Giant roundleaf bat); M. thomensis (São Tomé leaf-nosed bat); M. vittata (Striped leaf-nosed bat) | Sub-Saharan Africa | Size range: 9 cm (4 in) long, plus 2 cm (1 in) tail (giant roundleaf bat) to 13 cm (5 in) long, plus 4 cm (2 in) tail (striped leaf-nosed bat) Habitats: Rocky areas, caves, savanna, and forest |

===== Family Megadermatidae =====
Members of the Megadermatidae family are called megadermatids, or colloquially false vampire bats. They are primarily insectivorous, but will also eat a wide range of small vertebrates. Megadermatidae comprises six extant species, each in their own genus.

Not assigned to a named subfamily – six genera
| Name | Authority and species | Range | Size and ecology |
|---|---|---|---|
| Cardioderma | Peters, 1873 One species: C. cor (Heart-nosed bat) | Eastern Africa | Size: 7–8 cm (3–3 in) long, with no tail Habitats: Forest, savanna, and shrubland |
| Eudiscoderma | Soisook, Prajakjitr, Sunate Karapan, Francis, & Bates, 2015 One species: E. thongareeae (Thongaree's disc-nosed bat) | Thailand | Size: 7–8 cm (3–3 in) long, with no tail Habitat: Forest |
| Lavia | J. E. Gray, 1838 One species: L. frons (Yellow-winged bat) | Sub-Saharan Africa | Size: 6–9 cm (2–4 in) long, with no tail Habitats: Forest, savanna, and shrubland |
| Lyroderma | Peters, 1872 Two species: L. lyra (Greater false vampire bat, pictured); L. sinense (Chinese false vampire bat) | Southern and southeastern Asia | Size range: 7–10 cm (3–4 in) long, with no tail Habitats: Forest, shrubland, rocky areas, and caves |
| Macroderma | Miller, 1906 One species: M. gigas (Ghost bat) | Northern Australia | Size: 10–13 cm (4–5 in) long, with no tail Habitats: Forest, savanna, shrubland, rocky areas, and caves |
| Megaderma | (Geoffroy, 1810) One species: M. spasma (Lesser false vampire bat) | Southern and southeastern Asia | Size: 5–9 cm (2–4 in) long, with no tail Habitats: Savanna, shrubland, forest, caves, desert, grassland, rocky areas, and inland wetlands |

===== Family Rhinolophidae =====
Members of the Rhinolophidae family are called rhinolophids, or colloquially horseshoe bats. They are all insectivorous. Rhinolophidae comprises 118 extant species in a single genus.

Not assigned to a named subfamily – one genus
| Name | Authority and species | Range | Size and ecology |
|---|---|---|---|
| Rhinolophus (horseshoe bat) | Lacépède, 1799 118 species: R. achilles (Queensland horseshoe bat); R. acrotis (Eritrean horseshoe bat); R. acuminatus (Acuminate horseshoe bat); R. adami (Adam's horseshoe bat); R. affinis (Intermediate horseshoe bat); R. alcyone (Halcyon horseshoe bat); R. alticolus (Cameroon horseshoe bat); R. andamanensis (Homfray's horseshoe bat); R. arcuatus (Arcuate horseshoe bat); R. axillaris (Tufted horseshoe bat); R. beddomei (Beddome's horseshoe bat); R. belligerator (Poso horseshoe bat); R. blasii (Blasius's horseshoe bat); R. bocharicus (Bokhara horseshoe bat); R. borneensis (Bornean horseshoe bat); R. canuti (Canut's horseshoe bat); R. capensis (Cape horseshoe bat); R. celebensis (Sulawesi horseshoe bat); R. cervenyi (Červený's horseshoe bat); R. chaseni (Chasen's horseshoe bat); R. chiewkweeae (Chiewkwee's horseshoe bat); R. clivosus (Geoffroy's horseshoe bat); R. coelophyllus (Croslet horseshoe bat); R. cognatus (Andaman horseshoe bat); R. cohenae (Cohen's horseshoe bat); R. convexus (Convex horseshoe bat); R. cornutus (Little Japanese horseshoe bat); R. creaghi (Creagh's horseshoe bat); R. damarensis (Damara horseshoe bat); R. darlingi (Darling's horseshoe bat); R. deckenii (Decken's horseshoe bat); R. denti (Dent's horseshoe bat); R. dobsoni (Sudanese horseshoe bat); R. eloquens (Eloquent horseshoe bat); R. episcopus (Guardian horseshoe bat); R. euryale (Mediterranean horseshoe bat); R. euryotis (Broad-eared horseshoe bat); R. ferrumequinum (Greater horseshoe bat); R. foetidus (Andersen's woolly horseshoe bat); R. formosae (Formosan woolly horseshoe bat); R. francisi (Francis's woolly horseshoe bat); R. fumigatus (Rüppell's horseshoe bat); R. guineensis (Guinean horseshoe bat); R. hildebrandtii (Hildebrandt's horseshoe bat); R. hilli (Hill's horseshoe bat); R. hillorum (Hills' horseshoe bat); R. hipposideros (Lesser horseshoe bat); R. hirsutus (Hairy horseshoe bat); R. horaceki (Horáček's horseshoe bat); R. imaizumii (Imaizumi's horseshoe bat); R. inops (Philippine forest horseshoe bat); R. keyensis (Insular horseshoe bat); R. kirghisorum (Kyrgyzstan horseshoe bat); R. landeri (Lander's horseshoe bat); R. lepidus (Blyth's horseshoe bat); R. lobatus (Lobed horseshoe bat); R. luctus (Great woolly horseshoe bat); R. mabuensis (Mount Mabu horseshoe bat); R. maclaudi (Maclaud's horseshoe bat); R. macrotis (Big-eared horseshoe bat); R. madurensis (Madura horseshoe bat); R. maendeleo (Maendeleo horseshoe bat); R. malayanus (Malayan horseshoe bat); R. marshalli (Marshall's horseshoe bat); R. mcintyrei (McIntyre's horseshoe bat); R. megaphyllus (Smaller horseshoe bat); R. mehelyi (Mehely's horseshoe bat); R. microglobosus (Indo-Chinese lesser brown horseshoe bat); R. midas (Midas' horseshoe bat); R. mitratus (Mitred horseshoe bat); R. monoceros (Formosan lesser horseshoe bat); R. montanus (Timorese horseshoe bat); R. morio (Malaysian woolly horseshoe bat); R. mossambicus (Mozambican horseshoe bat); R. namuli (Namuli horseshoe bat); R. nereis (Neriad horseshoe bat); R. nippon (Greater Japanese horseshoe bat); R. osgoodi (Osgood's horseshoe bat); R. paradoxolophus (Bourret's horseshoe bat); R. pearsonii (Pearson's horseshoe bat); R. perditus (Yaeyama little horseshoe bat); R. philippinensis (Large-eared horseshoe bat); R. proconsulis (Bornean woolly horseshoe bat); R. pumilus (Little Okinawan horseshoe bat); R. pusillus (Least horseshoe bat); R. refulgens (Glossy horseshoe bat); R. rex (King horseshoe bat); R. robinsoni (Peninsular horseshoe bat); R. rouxii (Rufous horseshoe bat, pictured); R. rufus (Large rufous horseshoe bat); R. ruwenzorii (Ruwenzori horseshoe bat); R. sakejiensis (Sakeji horseshoe bat); R. sedulus (Lesser woolly horseshoe bat); R. septentrionalis (Northern horseshoe bat); R. shameli (Shamel's horseshoe bat); R. shortridgei (Shortridge's horseshoe bat); R. siamensis (Thai horseshoe bat); R. silvestris (Forest horseshoe bat); R. simulator (Bushveld horseshoe bat); R. sinicus (Chinese rufous horseshoe bat); R. smithersi (Smithers's horseshoe bat); R. stheno (Lesser brown horseshoe bat); R. subbadius (Little Nepalese horseshoe bat); R. subrufus (Small rufous horseshoe bat); R. swinnyi (Swinny's horseshoe bat); R. tatar (Sulawesi broad-eared horseshoe bat); R. thailandensis (Thailand horseshoe bat); R. thomasi (Thomas's horseshoe bat); R. trifoliatus (Trefoil horseshoe bat); R. virgo (Yellow-faced horseshoe bat); R. webalai (Webala's horseshoe bat); R. willardi (Willard's horseshoe bat); R. xinanzhongguoensis (Wedge-sellaed horseshoe bat); R. yonghoiseni (Yong Hoi Sen's wooly horseshoe bat); R. yunanensis (Dobson's horseshoe bat); R. ziama (Ziama horseshoe bat) | Europe, Africa, Asia, and Australia | Size range: 3 cm (1 in) long, plus 1 cm (0.4 in) tail (Blyth's horseshoe bat) to 10 cm (4 in) long, plus 4 cm (2 in) tail (large rufous horseshoe bat) Habitats: Savanna, shrubland, forest, caves, desert, grassland, rocky areas, and inland wetlands |

===== Family Rhinonycteridae =====
Members of the Rhinonycteridae family are called rhinonycterids, or colloquially trident bats. They are all insectivorous. Rhinolophidae comprises nine extant species in four genera.

Not assigned to a named subfamily – four genera
| Name | Authority and species | Range | Size and ecology |
|---|---|---|---|
| Cloeotis | Thomas, 1901 One species: C. percivali (Percival's trident bat) | Southern Africa | Size range: 3–5 cm (1–2 in) long, plus 1–4 cm (0–2 in) tail Habitats: Forest, savanna, and caves |
| Paratriaenops (Madagascar trident bat) | Benda & Vallo, 1847 Three species: P. auritus (Grandidier's trident bat); P. furcula (Trouessart's trident bat); P. pauliani (Paulian's trident bat) | Madagascar | Size range: 4–7 cm (2–3 in) long, plus 1–3 cm (0–1 in) tail (Grandidier's trident bat) Habitats: Forest, caves, and rocky areas |
| Rhinonicteris | J. E. Gray, 1847 One species: R. aurantia (Orange leaf-nosed bat) | Northern Australia | Size range: 4–6 cm (2–2 in) long, plus 2–3 cm (1–1 in) tail Habitats: Savanna and caves |
| Triaenops (trident bat) | Dobson, 1871 Four species: T. afer (African trident bat); T. menamena (Rufous trident bat); T. parvus (Yemeni trident leaf-nosed bat); T. persicus (Persian trident bat, pictured) | Africa and western Asia | Size range: 5 cm (2 in) long, plus 3 cm (1 in) tail (Yemeni trident leaf-nosed bat) to 8 cm (3 in) long, plus 4 cm (2 in) tail (multiple) Habitats: Forest, savanna, shrubland, and caves |

===== Family Rhinopomatidae =====
Members of the Rhinopomatidae family are called rhinopomatids, or colloquially mouse-tailed bats. They are all insectivorous. Rhinopomatidae comprises six extant species in a single genus.

Not assigned to a named subfamily – one genus
| Name | Authority and species | Range | Size and ecology |
|---|---|---|---|
| Rhinopoma (mouse-tailed bat) | Geoffroy, 1818 Six species: R. cystops (Egyptian mouse-tailed bat); R. hadramauticum (Yemeni mouse-tailed bat); R. hardwickii (Lesser mouse-tailed bat); R. macinnesi (Macinnes's mouse-tailed bat); R. microphyllum (Greater mouse-tailed bat); R. muscatellum (Small mouse-tailed bat, pictured) | Northern and eastern Africa and western and southern Asia | Size range: 5 cm (2 in) long, plus 5 cm (2.0 in) tail (Egyptian mouse-tailed bat) to 9 cm (4 in) long, plus 9 cm (4 in) tail (greater mouse-tailed bat) Habitats: Grassland, shrubland, rocky areas, caves, forest, and desert |

== Sources ==
- Chernasky, Amy; Motis, Anna; Burgin, Connor, eds. (2023). All the Mammals of the World. Lynx Nature Books. ISBN 978-84-16728-66-4.
- Simmons, Nancy B. (2005). Wilson, Don E.; Reeder, DeeAnn M. (eds.). Mammal Species of the World. Vol. 1 (3rd ed.). Johns Hopkins University Press. ISBN 978-0-8018-8221-0.
- Nowak, Ronald M. (1994). Walker's Bats of the World. Johns Hopkins University Press. ISBN 978-0-8018-4986-2.
