= List of murinines =

Species in mammal subfamily Murininae

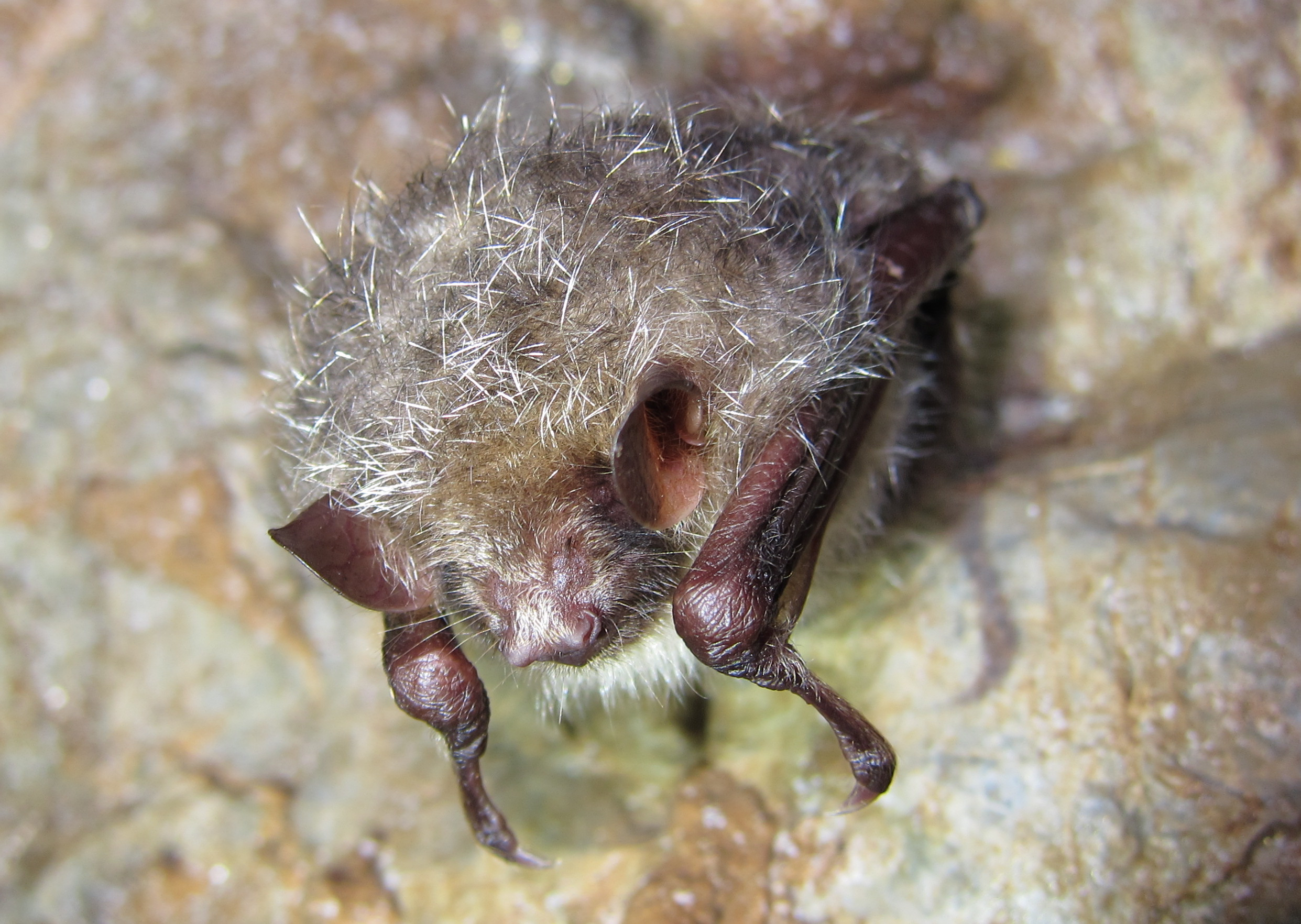
Hilgendorf's tube-nosed bat (Murina hilgendorfi)

Murininae is one of the four subfamilies of Vespertilionidae, itself one of twenty families of bats in the mammalian order Chiroptera and part of the microbat suborder. A member of this subfamily is called a murinine, or a tube-nosed bat. They are found in Asia and Australia, primarily in forests and caves, though some species can also be found in savannas. They range in size from the Da Lat tube-nosed bat, at 3 cm (1 in) plus a 2 cm (1 in) tail, to the lesser hairy-winged bat, at 8 cm (3 in) plus a 5 cm (2 in) tail. Like all bats, murinines are capable of true and sustained flight. They have forearm lengths ranging from 2 cm (1 in) to 6 cm (2 in). They are all insectivorous and eat a variety of insects and spiders. Almost no murinines have population estimates, though two—the Da Lat tube-nosed bat and Ryukyu tube-nosed bat—are categorized as endangered species, and two species—the Bala tube-nosed bat and gloomy tube-nosed bat—are categorized as critically endangered.

The 56 extant species of Murininae are divided between three genera: Harpiocephalus with one species, Harpiola with two species, and Murina with the other 53. A few extinct prehistoric murinine species have been discovered, though due to ongoing research and discoveries the exact number and categorization is not fixed.

== Conventions ==
IUCN Red List categories
Conservation status
- EX: Extinct (0 species)
- EW: Extinct in the wild (0 species)
- CR: Critically endangered (2 species)
- EN: Endangered (2 species)
- VU: Vulnerable (2 species)
- NT: Near threatened (0 species)
- LC: Least concern (18 species)

Other categories
- DD: Data deficient (11 species)
- NE: Not evaluated (21 species)

The author citation for the species or genus is given after the scientific name; parentheses around the author citation indicate that this was not the original taxonomic placement. Conservation status codes listed follow the International Union for Conservation of Nature (IUCN) Red List of Threatened Species. Range maps are provided wherever possible; if a range map is not available, a description of the murinine's range is provided. Ranges are based on the IUCN Red List for that species unless otherwise noted. Population figures are rounded to the nearest hundred.

== Classification ==
Murininae, one of the four subfamilies of the family Vespertilionidae, contains 56 extant species divided into 3 genera.

Subfamily Murininae

- Genus Harpiocephalus (lesser hairy-winged bat): one species
- Genus Harpiola (tube-nosed bats): two species
- Genus Murina (tube-nosed bats): 53 species

== Murinines ==
The following classification is based on the taxonomy described by the reference work Mammal Species of the World (2005), with augmentation by generally accepted proposals made since using molecular phylogenetic analysis, as supported by both the IUCN SSC Bat Specialist Group and the American Society of Mammalogists.

Genus Harpiocephalus – Gray, 1842 – one species
Common name	Scientific name and subspecies	Range	Size and ecology	IUCN status and estimated population
Lesser hairy-winged bat	H. harpia Temminck, 1840 Four subspecies: H. h. harpia; H. h. lasyurus; H. h. madrassius; H. h. rufulus	Southeastern Asia	Size: 5–8 cm (2–3 in), plus 4–5 cm (2 in) tail 4–6 cm (2 in) forearm length Habitat: Forest	LC Unknown

Genus Harpiola – Thomas, 1915 – two species
Common name	Scientific name and subspecies	Range	Size and ecology	IUCN status and estimated population
Formosan golden tube-nosed bat	H. isodon Kuo, Fang, Csorba, & Lee, 2006	Taiwan	Size: 4–6 cm (2 in), plus 2–4 cm (1–2 in) tail 3–4 cm (1–2 in) forearm length Habitat: Forest, inland wetlands, and caves	LC Unknown
Peters's tube-nosed bat	H. grisea Peters, 1872	Northern and eastern India	Size: About 5 cm (2 in), plus about 3 cm (1 in) tail 3–4 cm (1–2 in) forearm length Habitat: Forest	DD Unknown

Genus Murina – Gray, 1842 – 53 species
Common name	Scientific name and subspecies	Range	Size and ecology	IUCN status and estimated population
Annam tube-nosed bat	M. annamitica Francis & Eger, 2012	Southeastern Asia	Size: 3–6 cm (1–2 in), plus 3–4 cm (1–2 in) tail 2–4 cm (1–2 in) forearm length Habitat: Forest and savanna	LC Unknown
Alvarez's tube-nosed bat	M. alvarezi Eger, Sedlock, Lim, & Heaney, 2025	Philippines	Size: 3–5 cm (1–2 in), plus 2–5 cm (1–2 in) tail 2–4 cm (1–2 in) forearm length Habitat: Forest and caves	NE Unknown
Bala tube-nosed bat	M. balaensis Soisook, Karapan, Satasook, & Bates, 2013	Thailand	Size: About 3 cm (1 in), plus 3–4 cm (1–2 in) tail 2–3 cm (1 in) forearm length Habitat: Forest	CR Unknown
Balete's tube-nosed bat	M. baletei Eger, Sedlock, Lim, & Heaney, 2025	Philippines	Size: 3–5 cm (1–2 in), plus 2–5 cm (1–2 in) tail 2–4 cm (1–2 in) forearm length Habitat: Forest and caves	NE Unknown
Beelzebub's tube-nosed bat	M. beelzebub Son, Furey, & Csorba, 2011	Vietnam and Laos	Size: 4–5 cm (2 in), plus 3–5 cm (1–2 in) tail 3–4 cm (1–2 in) forearm length Habitat: Forest	DD Unknown
Beibeng tube-nosed bat	M. beibengensis Luo, Mao, & Zhou, 2025	China	Size: 3–5 cm (1–2 in), plus 2–5 cm (1–2 in) tail 2–4 cm (1–2 in) forearm length Habitat: Forest and caves	NE Unknown
Bicolored tube-nosed bat	M. bicolor Kuo, Fang, Csorba, & Lee, 2009	Taiwan	Size: 4–5 cm (2 in), plus 4–5 cm (2 in) tail 3–5 cm (1–2 in) forearm length Habitat: Forest	LC Unknown
Bronze tube-nosed bat	M. aenea Hill, 1964	Malaysia	Size: 4–6 cm (2 in), plus 3–5 cm (1–2 in) tail 3–4 cm (1–2 in) forearm length Habitat: Forest	VU Unknown
Brown tube-nosed bat	M. suilla Temminck, 1840 Two subspecies: M. s. canescens; M. s. suilla	Southeastern Asia	Size: 3–7 cm (1–3 in), plus 2–4 cm (1–2 in) tail 2–4 cm (1–2 in) forearm length Habitat: Forest	LC Unknown
Chayu tube-nosed bat	M. chayuensis Luo & Zhou, 2025	China	Size: 3–5 cm (1–2 in), plus 2–5 cm (1–2 in) tail 2–4 cm (1–2 in) forearm length Habitat: Forest and caves	NE Unknown
Da Lat tube-nosed bat	M. harpioloides Kruskop & Eger, 2008	Vietnam	Size: 3–4 cm (1–2 in), plus 2–3 cm (1 in) tail about 3 cm (1 in) forearm length Habitat: Forest	EN Unknown
Dusky tube-nosed bat	M. fusca Sowerby, 1922	Northeastern China	Size: About 6 cm (2 in), plus about 3 cm (1 in) tail about 4 cm (2 in) forearm length Habitat: Unknown	DD Unknown
Elery's tube-nosed bat	M. eleryi Furey, Thong, Bates, & Csorba, 2009	Southeastern Asia	Size: 3–4 cm (1–2 in), plus 2–4 cm (1–2 in) tail 2–4 cm (1–2 in) forearm length Habitat: Forest	LC Unknown
Fea's tube-nosed bat	M. feae Thomas, 1891	Southeastern Asia	Size: 3–5 cm (1–2 in), plus 2–5 cm (1–2 in) tail 2–4 cm (1–2 in) forearm length Habitat: Forest and caves	LC Unknown
Fiona's tube-nosed bat	M. fionae Francis & Eger, 2012	Southeastern Asia	Size: 4–6 cm (2 in), plus 3–5 cm (1–2 in) tail 3–4 cm (1–2 in) forearm length Habitat: Forest	LC Unknown
Flute-nosed bat	M. florium Thomas, 1908 Three subspecies: M. f. florium; M. f. lanosa; M. f. toxopei	Southeastern Asia and Northern Australia (M. f. florium in red, M. f. lanosa in blue, and M. f. toxopei in green)	Size: 3–6 cm (1–2 in), plus 3–4 cm (1–2 in) tail 3–4 cm (1–2 in) forearm length Habitat: Forest and savanna	LC Unknown
Fujian tube-nosed bat	M. rubella Thomas, 1914	Southeastern Asia	Size: 4–6 cm (2 in), plus 3–5 cm (1–2 in) tail 3–4 cm (1–2 in) forearm length Habitat: Forest	NE Unknown
Gilded tube-nosed bat	M. rozendaali Hill & Francis, 1984	Southeastern Asia	Size: 4–5 cm (2 in), plus 2–5 cm (1–2 in) tail 2–4 cm (1–2 in) forearm length Habitat: Forest	VU Unknown
Gloomy tube-nosed bat	M. tenebrosa Yoshiyuki, 1970	Tsushima Island in Japan	Size: About 5 cm (2 in), plus about 3 cm (1 in) tail about 3 cm (1 in) forearm length Habitat: Caves	CR 1
Golden-haired tube-nosed bat	M. chrysochaetes Eger & Lim, 2011	Southern China and northern Vietnam	Size: 4–5 cm (2 in), plus 2–3 cm (1 in) tail 2–3 cm (1 in) forearm length Habitat: Forest	DD Unknown
Greater tube-nosed bat	M. leucogaster (A. Milne-Edwards, 1872) Two subspecies: M. l. leucogaster; M. l. rubex	Eastern Asia	Size: 4–7 cm (2–3 in), plus 3–5 cm (1–2 in) tail 3–5 cm (1–2 in) forearm length Habitat: Forest	LC Unknown
Guillén's tube-nosed bat	M. guilleni Soisook, Karapan, Satasook, Thong, Khan, Maryanto, Csorba, Furey, Aul, & Bates, 2013	Andaman and Nicobar Islands and Thailand	Size: 4–6 cm (2 in), plus 2–5 cm (1–2 in) tail 3–4 cm (1–2 in) forearm length Habitat: Forest and caves	NE Unknown
Harrison's tube-nosed bat	M. harrisoni Csorba & Bates, 2005	Southeastern Asia	Size: 3–6 cm (1–2 in), plus 3–5 cm (1–2 in) tail 3–4 cm (1–2 in) forearm length Habitat: Forest	LC Unknown
Hidden tube-nosed bat	M. recondita Kuo, Fang, Csorba, & Lee, 2009	Taiwan	Size: Unknown length 2–4 cm (1–2 in) forearm length Habitat: Forest	LC Unknown
Hilgendorf's tube-nosed bat	M. hilgendorfi Peters, 1880	Eastern Asia	Size: 4–7 cm (2–3 in), plus 3–5 cm (1–2 in) tail 3–5 cm (1–2 in) forearm length Habitat: Caves and forest	LC Unknown
Hilong-hilong tube-nosed bat	M. hilonghilong Eger, Sedlock, Lim, & Heaney, 2025	Philippines	Size: 3–5 cm (1–2 in), plus 2–5 cm (1–2 in) tail 2–4 cm (1–2 in) forearm length Habitat: Forest and caves	NE Unknown
Hkakabo Razi tube-nosed bat	M. hkakaboraziensis Soisook, Thaw, Kyaw, Oo, Pimsai, Suarez-Rubio, & Renner, 2017	Philippines	Size: About 4 cm (2 in), plus about 3 cm (1 in) tail about 3 cm (1 in) forearm length Habitat: Forest	NE Unknown
Huanglianshan tube-nosed bat	M. huanglianensis Li & Mou, 2026	China	Size: About 3 cm (1 in), plus 3–4 cm (1–2 in) tail 2–3 cm (1 in) forearm length Habitat: Forest	NE Unknown
Hutton's tube-nosed bat	M. huttoni (Peters, 1872)	Southern and southeastern Asia	Size: 4–6 cm (2 in), plus 3–5 cm (1–2 in) tail 3–4 cm (1–2 in) forearm length Habitat: Forest	LC Unknown
Jaintia tube-nosed bat	M. jaintiana Ruedi, Biswas, & Csorba, 2012	India and Myanmar	Size: About 4 cm (2 in), plus about 3 cm (1 in) tail 2–4 cm (1–2 in) forearm length Habitat: Forest	DD Unknown
Jinchu's tube-nosed bat	M. jinchui Yu, Csorba, & Wu, 2020	China	Size: 4–5 cm (1 in), plus 3–4 cm (1–2 in) tail 3–4 cm (1–2 in) forearm length Habitat: Forest	NE Unknown
Kon Tum tube-nosed bat	M. kontumensis Son, Csorba, Tu, & Motokawa, 2015	Philippines	Size: About 4 cm (2 in), plus about 4 cm (2 in) tail about 3 cm (1 in) forearm length Habitat: Forest	NE Unknown
Libo tube-nosed bat	M. liboensis Zeng, Chen, Deng, Xiao, & Zhou, 2018	China	Size: 3–5 cm (1–2 in), plus 3–4 cm (1–2 in) tail 2–4 cm (1–2 in) forearm length Habitat: Forest and caves	NE Unknown
Little tube-nosed bat	M. aurata A. Milne-Edwards, 1872	Southern and eastern Asia	Size: 3–5 cm (1–2 in), plus 2–4 cm (1–2 in) tail 2–4 cm (1–2 in) forearm length Habitat: Forest	DD Unknown
Lorelie's tube-nosed bat	M. lorelieae Eger & Lim, 2011	Southern China	Size: 3–5 cm (1–2 in), plus 3–5 cm (1–2 in) tail 3–4 cm (1–2 in) forearm length Habitat: Forest	DD Unknown
Luzon tube-nosed bat	M. luzonensis Eger, Sedlock, Lim, & Heaney, 2025	Philippines	Size: 3–5 cm (1–2 in), plus 2–5 cm (1–2 in) tail 2–4 cm (1–2 in) forearm length Habitat: Forest and caves	NE Unknown
Medog tube-nosed bat	M. medogensis Mao, Lan, & Zhou, 2025	China	Size: 3–5 cm (1–2 in), plus 3–4 cm (1–2 in) tail 2–4 cm (1–2 in) forearm length Habitat: Forest and caves	NE Unknown
Milin tube-nosed bat	M. milinensis Luo, Mao, & Zhou, 2025	China	Size: 3–5 cm (1–2 in), plus 3–4 cm (1–2 in) tail 2–4 cm (1–2 in) forearm length Habitat: Forest and caves	NE Unknown
Mindoro tube-nosed bat	M. mindorensis Eger, Sedlock, Lim, & Heaney, 2025	Philippines	Size: 3–5 cm (1–2 in), plus 2–5 cm (1–2 in) tail 2–4 cm (1–2 in) forearm length Habitat: Forest and caves	NE Unknown
Peninsular tube-nosed bat	M. peninsularis Hill, 1964	Philippines	Size: 3–5 cm (1–2 in), plus 2–5 cm (1–2 in) tail 2–4 cm (1–2 in) forearm length Habitat: Forest and caves	NE Unknown
Philippine tube-nosed bat	M. philippinensis Eger, Sedlock, Lim, & Heaney, 2025	Philippines	Size: 3–5 cm (1–2 in), plus 2–5 cm (1–2 in) tail 2–4 cm (1–2 in) forearm length Habitat: Forest and caves	NE Unknown
Rainforest tube-nosed bat	M. pluvialis Ruedi, Biswas, & Csorba, 2012	India	Size: About 4 cm (2 in), plus about 3 cm (1 in) tail about 3 cm (1 in) forearm length Habitat: Forest	DD Unknown
Round-eared tube-nosed bat	M. cyclotis Dobson, 1872 Three subspecies: M. c. cyclotis; M. c. eileenae	Southern and southeastern Asia	Size: 3–5 cm (1–2 in), plus 2–5 cm (1–2 in) tail 2–4 cm (1–2 in) forearm length Habitat: Forest and caves	LC Unknown
Ryukyu tube-nosed bat	M. ryukyuana Maeda & Matsumura, 1998	Japan	Size: 4–5 cm (2 in), plus 3–5 cm (1–2 in) tail 3–4 cm (1–2 in) forearm length Habitat: Forest	EN Unknown
Scully's tube-nosed bat	M. tubinaris Scully, 1881	Central Asia	Size: About 5 cm (2 in), plus about 4 cm (2 in) tail 3–4 cm (1–2 in) forearm length Habitat: Forest	DD Unknown
Shuipu tube-nosed bat	M. shuipuensis Eger & Lim, 2011	Southern China	Size: 3–5 cm (1–2 in), plus 3–5 cm (1–2 in) tail 3–4 cm (1–2 in) forearm length Habitat: Unknown	DD Unknown
Slender tube-nosed bat	M. gracilis Kuo, Fang, Csorba, & Lee, 2009	Taiwan	Size: Unknown length 2–4 cm (1–2 in) forearm length Habitat: Forest	LC Unknown
Taiwan tube-nosed bat	M. puta Kishida, 1924	Taiwan	Size: 5–7 cm (2–3 in), plus 3–4 cm (1–2 in) tail 3–4 cm (1–2 in) forearm length Habitat: Forest	LC Unknown
Ussuri tube-nosed bat	M. ussuriensis Ogniov, 1913	Eastern Asia	Size: 4–5 cm (2 in), plus 2–4 cm (1–2 in) tail 2–4 cm (1–2 in) forearm length Habitat: Forest and caves	LC Unknown
Walston's tube-nosed bat	M. walstoni Furey, Csorba, & Son, 2011	Southeastern Asia	Size: 3–5 cm (1–2 in), plus 2–4 cm (1–2 in) tail 2–4 cm (1–2 in) forearm length Habitat: Forest	DD Unknown
Yadong tube-nosed bat	M. yadongensis Mao, Zhao, & Zhou, 2025	China	Size: 3–5 cm (1–2 in), plus 3–4 cm (1–2 in) tail 2–4 cm (1–2 in) forearm length Habitat: Forest and caves	NE Unknown
Yuanyang tube-nosed bat	M. yuanyang Mou, Qian, Li] (zoologist), Li, Luo, & Li, 2025	China	Size: 3–5 cm (1–2 in), plus 3–4 cm (1–2 in) tail 2–4 cm (1–2 in) forearm length Habitat: Forest and caves	NE Unknown
Yushu tube-nosed bat	M. yushuensis Han, Csorba, & Wu, 2024	China	Size: 3–5 cm (1–2 in), plus 3–4 cm (1–2 in) tail 2–4 cm (1–2 in) forearm length Habitat: Forest and caves	NE Unknown

== Sources ==
- Chernasky, Amy; Motis, Anna; Burgin, Connor, eds. (2023). All the Mammals of the World. Lynx Nature Books. ISBN 978-84-16728-66-4.
- Simmons, Nancy B. (2005). Wilson, Don E.; Reeder, DeeAnn M. (eds.). Mammal Species of the World. Vol. 1 (3rd ed.). Johns Hopkins University Press. ISBN 978-0-8018-8221-0.
- Nowak, Ronald M. (1994). Walker's Bats of the World. Johns Hopkins University Press. ISBN 978-0-8018-4986-2.
