= Tube-nosed bat =

Tube-nosed bat may refer to any of the following species:

== Suborder Yangochiroptera ==
- Genus Murina
  - Bronze tube-nosed bat, M. aenea
  - Little tube-nosed bat, M. aurata
  - Beelzebub's tube-nosed bat, M. beelzebub
  - Bicolored tube-nosed bat, M. bicolor
  - Ashy-gray tube-nosed bat, M. cineracea
  - Round-eared tube-nosed bat, M. cyclotis
  - Elery's tube-nosed bat, M. eleryi
  - Flute-nosed bat, M. florium
  - Dusky tube-nosed bat, M. fusca
  - Slender tube-nosed bat, M. gracilis
  - Da Lat tube-nosed bat, Murina harpioloides
  - Harrison's tube-nosed bat, M. harrisoni
  - Hilgendorf's tube-nosed bat, M. hilgendorfi
  - Hkakabo Razi tube-nosed bat, M. hkakaboraziensis
  - Hutton's tube-nosed bat, M. huttoni
  - Greater tube-nosed bat, M. leucogaster
  - Taiwan tube-nosed bat, M. puta
  - Faint-colored tube-nosed bat, M. recondita
  - Gilded tube-nosed bat, M. rozendaali
  - Ryukyu tube-nosed bat, M. ryukyuana
  - Brown tube-nosed bat, M. suilla
  - Gloomy tube-nosed bat, M. tenebrosa
  - Scully's tube-nosed bat, M. tubinaris
  - Ussuri tube-nosed bat, M. ussuriensis
  - Walston's tube-nosed bat, M. walstoni
- Genus Harpiola
  - Peters's tube-nosed bat, H. grisea
  - Formosan golden tube-nosed bat, H. isodon

== Suborder Yinpterochiroptera ==
- Genus Nyctimene
  - Broad-striped tube-nosed bat, Nyctimene aello
  - Common tube-nosed bat, Nyctimene albiventer
  - Pallas's tube-nosed bat, Nyctimene cephalotes
  - Dark tube-nosed bat, Nyctimene celaeno
  - Mountain tube-nosed bat, Nyctimene certans
  - Round-eared tube-nosed bat, Nyctimene cyclotis
  - Dragon tube-nosed bat, Nyctimene draconilla
  - Keast's tube-nosed bat, Nyctimene keasti
  - Island tube-nosed bat, Nyctimene major
  - Malaita tube-nosed bat, Nyctimene malaitensis
  - Demonic tube-nosed bat, Nyctimene masalai
  - Lesser tube-nosed bat, Nyctimene minutus
  - Philippine tube-nosed bat, Nyctimene rabori
  - Eastern tube-nosed bat, Nyctimene robinsoni
  - Nendo tube-nosed bat, Nyctimene sanctacrucis
  - Umboi tube-nosed bat, Nyctimene vizcaccia
  - New Guinea tube-nosed bat, Nyctimene wrightae
