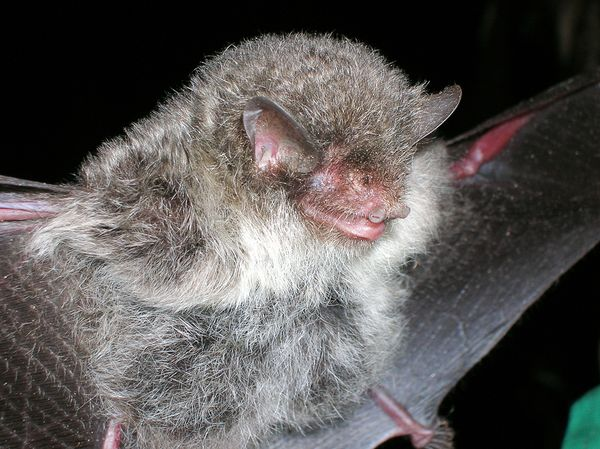
- Fea's tube-nosed bat (Murina feae)

Scientific classification
- Domain: Eukaryota
- Kingdom: Animalia
- Phylum: Chordata
- Class: Mammalia
- Order: Chiroptera
- Family: Vespertilionidae
- Subfamily: Murininae; Miller, 1907

= Murininae =

Subfamily of bats

The Murininae are a subfamily of bats in the family Vespertilionidae. They include the tube-nosed bats and hairy-winged bats in the genera Murina, Harpiola, and Harpiocephalus.

== Species ==
Subfamily Murininae

- Genus Murina – tube-nosed insectivorous bats
  - Bronze tube-nosed bat, M. aenea
  - Little tube-nosed bat, M. aurata
  - Beelzebub's tube-nosed bat, M. beelzebub
  - Bicolored tube-nosed bat, M. bicolor
  - Golden-haired tube-nosed bat, M. chrysochaetes
  - Round-eared tube-nosed bat, M. cyclotis
  - Elery's tube-nosed bat, M. eleryi
  - Fang He tube-nosed bat, M. fanjingshanensis
  - Fea's tube-nosed bat, M. feae
  - Flute-nosed bat, M. florium
  - Dusky tube-nosed bat, M. fusca
  - Slender tube-nosed bat, M. gracilis
  - Da Lat tube-nosed bat, M. harpioloides
  - Harrison's tube-nosed bat, M. harrisoni
  - Hilgendorf's tube-nosed bat, M. hilgendorfi
  - Hkakabo Razi tube-nosed bat, M. hkakaboraziensis
  - Hutton's tube-nosed bat, M. huttoni
  - Greater tube-nosed bat, M. leucogaster
  - Jaintia tube-nosed bat, M. jaintia
  - Jinchu's tube-nosed bat, M. jinchui
  - Kon Tum tube-nosed bat, M. kontumensis
  - Libo tube-nosed bat, M. liboensis
  - Lorelie's tube-nosed bat, M. lorelieae
  - Peninsular tube-nosed bat, M. peninsularis
  - Taiwan tube-nosed bat, M. puta
  - Hidden tube-nosed bat, M. recondita
  - Rongjiang tube-nosed bat, M. rongjiangensis
  - Gilded tube-nosed bat, M. rozendaali
  - Ryukyu tube-nosed bat, M. ryukyuana
  - Shuipu tube-nosed bat, M. shuipuensis
  - Brown tube-nosed bat, M. suilla
  - Gloomy tube-nosed bat, M. tenebrosa
  - Scully's tube-nosed bat, M. tubinaris
  - Ussuri tube-nosed bat, M. ussuriensis
  - Walston's tube-nosed bat, M. walstoni
- Genus Harpiola
  - Peters's tube-nosed bat, H. (Murina) grisea
  - Formosan golden tube-nosed bat Harpiola isodon
- Genus Harpiocephalus – hairy-winged bats
  - Hairy-winged bat, H. harpia
  - Greater hairy-winged bat, H. mordax
