= Bala tube-nosed bat =

Conservation status
- Critically Endangered (IUCN 3.1)

Scientific classification
- Kingdom: Animalia
- Phylum: Chordata
- Class: Mammalia
- Order: Chiroptera
- Family: Vespertilionidae
- Genus: Murina
- Species: M. balaensis

Binomial name
- Murina balaensis Soisook, Karapan, Satasook & Bates, 2013
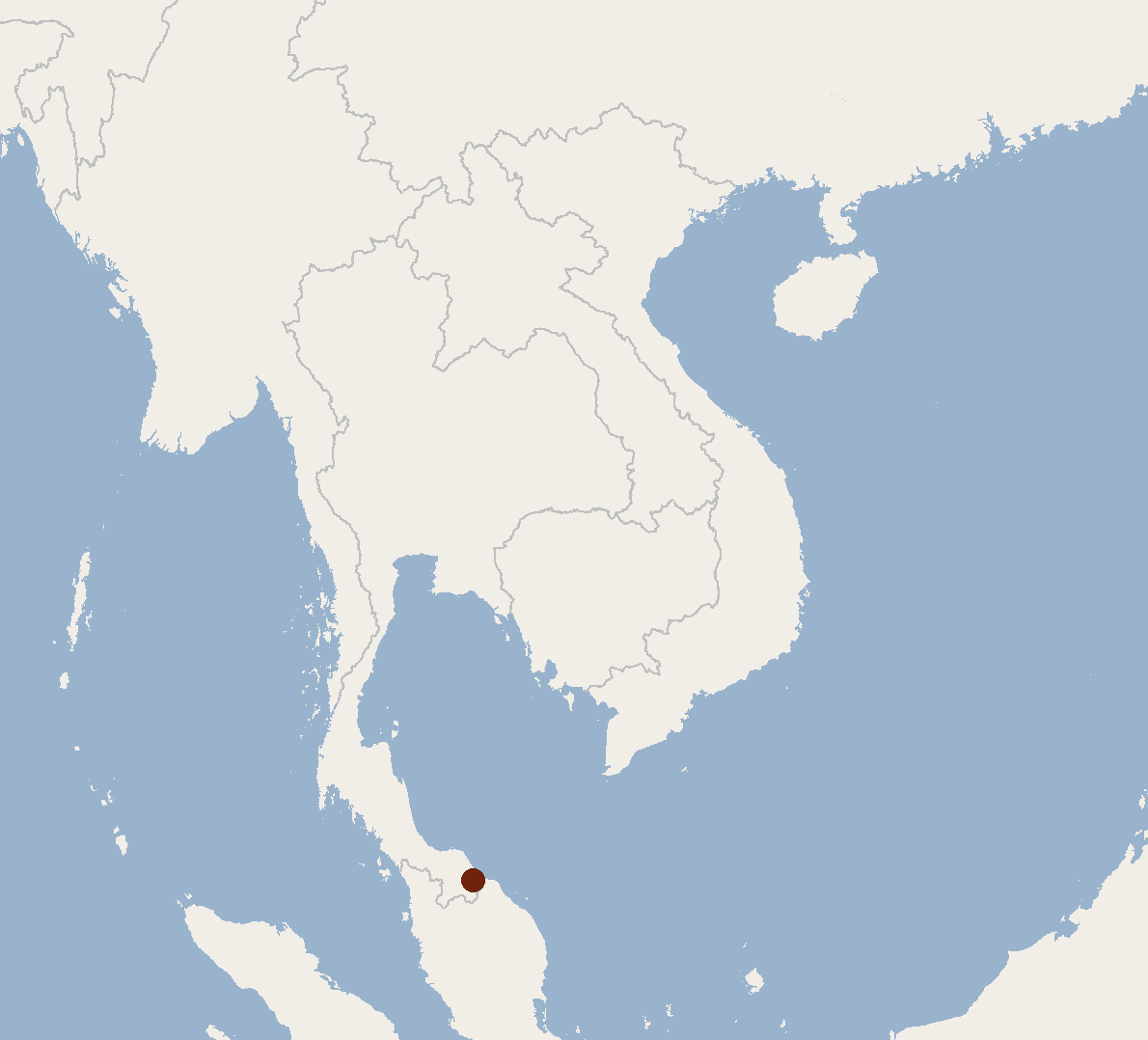

Species of bat

The Bala tube-nosed bat (Murina balaensis) is a critically endangered species of bat found in Thailand.

== Taxonomy and etymology ==
It was first encountered in September 2012. Its closest relative is Eleryi's tube-nosed bat (Murina eleryi). As the genus Murina is split into species groups, the Bala tube-nosed bat is placed into the suilla group, which also contains the little tube-nosed bat, Beelzebub's tube-nosed bat, the ashy-gray tube-nosed bat, Eleryi's tube-nosed bat, the slender tube-nosed bat, Murina harpioloides, the greater tube-nosed bat, Murina recondita, the forest tube-nosed bat (sometimes considered synonymous with the Ussuri tube-nosed bat), the brown tube-nosed bat, Scully's tube-nosed bat, and Ussuri tube-nosed bat. Its species name, balaensis, refers to the Bala Forest of Thailand where it is found.

== Description ==
It is a small bat, weighing only 3.5–4 g (0.12–0.14 oz). Its forearms are 28–30.4 mm (1.10–1.20 in) long. Its ears are rounded with smooth margins, measuring 12.3–12.8 mm (0.48–0.50 in) long. The ears are brown in color, with the base of the ear a lighter brown. The tragus is white and short, at 7.4–7.6 mm (0.29–0.30 in) long. Their dorsal fur is ashy-gray, with some hairs tipped in a reddish-orange tint of brown. Other dorsal hairs are tipped in a charcoal black color. Their heads, backs, uropatagia, and feet have silver-gold guard hairs. On their ventral side, their hairs are dark gray at the base, but whitish gray at the tips. Their thumbs are relatively long, at 8.2–8.8 mm (0.32–0.35 in) long. The calcar is well-developed, but lacks a keel.

== Biology ==
It eats insects, foraging for them only 2–3 m (6.6–9.8 ft) above the forest floor. It likely roosts in leaves or hollow trees.

== Range and habitat ==
It occurs in moist, evergreen lowland rainforests in the Narathiwat Province of southern Thailand. It has only been encountered in the Bala Forest of Hala-Bala Wildlife Sanctuary.

== Conservation ==
It is currently evaluated as critically endangered by the IUCN. It meets the criteria for this evaluation because its area of occupancy and extent of occurrence are both very small, at less than 4 km^{2} (1.5 mi^{2}). Also, there is a projected decline in the quality and extent of their habitat. It is threatened by habitat loss due to deforestation and the expansion of agriculture.
