= Murina fanjingshanensis =

Scientific classification
- Domain: Eukaryota
- Kingdom: Animalia
- Phylum: Chordata
- Class: Mammalia
- Order: Chiroptera
- Family: Vespertilionidae
- Genus: Murina
- Species: M. fanjingshanensis

Binomial name
- Murina fanjingshanensis He Fang, Xiao Ning, & Zhou Jiang, 2015

Species of bat

Murina fanjingshanensis is a species of vesper bat found in China.

== Taxonomy and systematics ==
Murina fanjingshanensis was described as a new species in 2015. The holotype had been collected in 2014 in an abandoned gold mine in the Fanjingshan National Nature Reserve of China. The species name fanjingshanensis is derived from the name of the nature reserve.

Based on a 2015 analysis of mitochondrial DNA, its sister taxon is the bicolored tube-nosed bat. A 2020 study that used nuclear and mitochondrial DNA, though did not include samples from the bicolored tube-nosed bat, found that it forms a clade with the following species: M. rongjiangensis, the Shuipu tube-nosed bat (M. shuipuensis), Hilgendorf's tube-nosed bat (M. hilgendorfi), M. jinchui, and the greater tube-nosed bat (M. leucogaster).

== Description ==
Murina fanjingshanensis is considered large for a species in the genus Murina. It is overall similar in appearance to the bicolored tube-nosed bat and the greater tube-nosed bat. It has a forearm length of about 40.6–41.4 mm (1.60–1.63 in). The fur on its back is fluffy and reddish-brown, while the fur on its chest and throat is yellow. The snout is black with tubular nostrils. The ears are oval with blunt tips and long, sharply pointed tragi. Its flight membranes are dark brown.

The greatest length of skull is 18.4–19.1 mm (0.72–0.75 in). Its dental formula is 2.1.2.33.1.2.3 for a total of 34 teeth.

== Range ==
Murina fanjingshanensis is found in south-west and south-central China, where it has been documented in Guizhou, Sichuan, and Hunan.
