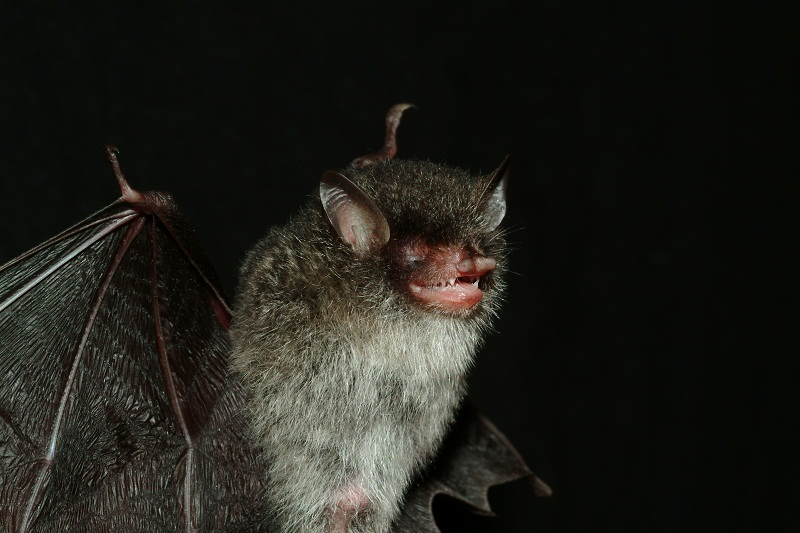
- In flight

Conservation status
- Data Deficient (IUCN 3.1)

Scientific classification
- Kingdom: Animalia
- Phylum: Chordata
- Class: Mammalia
- Order: Chiroptera
- Family: Vespertilionidae
- Genus: Murina
- Species: M. beelzebub

Binomial name
- Murina beelzebub Son, Furey & Csorba, 2011

= Beelzebub's tube-nosed bat =

Beelzebub bat

Species of bat

Beelzebub's tube-nosed bat (Murina beelzebub), also Beelzebub bat or demon bat, is a species in the vesper bat family Vespertilionidae, found in the Greater Mekong region of Southeast Asia, specifically the Quảng Trị and Gia Lai provinces of Vietnam. They have tube-shaped nostrils (hence the name) which assist them with their feeding.

== Discovery and etymology ==
The Beelzebub bat is one of 126 new species found in the Greater Mekong region described in 2011. The holotype was collected in November 2007 in Bac Huong Hoa Nature Reserve, which is located in Vietnam. There were two other tube-nosed bats found in Southeast Asia in 2011: Ashy-gray tube-nosed bat (Murina cineracea) and Walston's tube-nosed bat (Murina walstoni). All three species are small for bats and M. beelzebub is medium-sized for a Murina bat. These three new tube-nosed bats were discovered by a team from the Hungarian Natural History Museum (HNHM) and Fauna and Flora International (FFI). Vespertilionid bats have many cryptic species. Eight new species of vesper bats were found in Southeast Asia between 2005 and 2009. The use of DNA technology has proved very useful in differentiating between the various species of Murina.

Based on its morphology, it was placed into the suilla species group of the genus Murina. Members of the suilla group include:

- Little tube-nosed bat (Murina aurata)
- Bala tube-nosed bat (Murina balaensis)
- Ashy-gray tube-nosed bat (Murina cineracea)
- Eleryi's tube-nosed bat (Murina eleryi)
- Slender tube-nosed bat (Murina gracilis)
- Murina harpioloides
- Greater tube-nosed bat (Murina leucogaster)
- Murina recondita
- Brown tube-nosed bat (Murina suilla)
- Scully's tube-nosed bat (Murina tubinaris)
- Ussuri tube-nosed bat (Murina ussuriensis)
- Walston's tube-nosed bat (Murina walstoni)

It was named "Beelzebub" and "demon" because of its coloration and fierce behavior, alluding the use of the term "Beelzebub" as reference to the underworld in Christian texts.

== Description ==
This bat is small enough to fit in a person's hand, weighing 5.3 and 6.0 grams (0.19 and 0.21 oz). Its nostrils are tube-shaped. Its color pattern is unique for the regional habitat: a white underbelly, black head, and dark back. It lacks the golden guard hairs so common in other members of the genus Murina. Its behavior tends to "flight" before "fight" and it is also quite shy, avoiding human contact. However, if captured they can be very fierce. Its forearm is approximately 33.7 mm (1.33 in) long. Its tail is 40.6 mm (1.60 in) long, and its hind foot is 7.7 mm (0.30 in) long. Its ears are 13.8 mm (0.54 in) long, and its tragus is 7.9 mm (0.31 in) long. Its dental formula is 2.1.2.33.1.2.3, for a total of 34 teeth.

== Biology and ecology ==
As of 2013, there are still few details known about them and their ecology. Like other members of its genus, it is insectivorous.

== Range and habitat ==
It lives in tropical forests of the Greater Mekong Subregion. It has been documented in Kon Ka Kinh National Park and Bac Huong Hoa Nature Reserve, both of which are in Vietnam. It is suspected there are many more species of bats yet to be discovered in the region. It has been captured at elevations of 400 m (1,300 ft) and 1,600 m (5,200 ft) above sea level.

== Conservation ==
They are threatened by habitat loss via deforestation. As it is a relatively new species, it has not yet been evaluated by the IUCN.

== See also ==
- Peter's tube-nosed bat
- Scully's tube-nosed bat
