= List of vespertilionids =

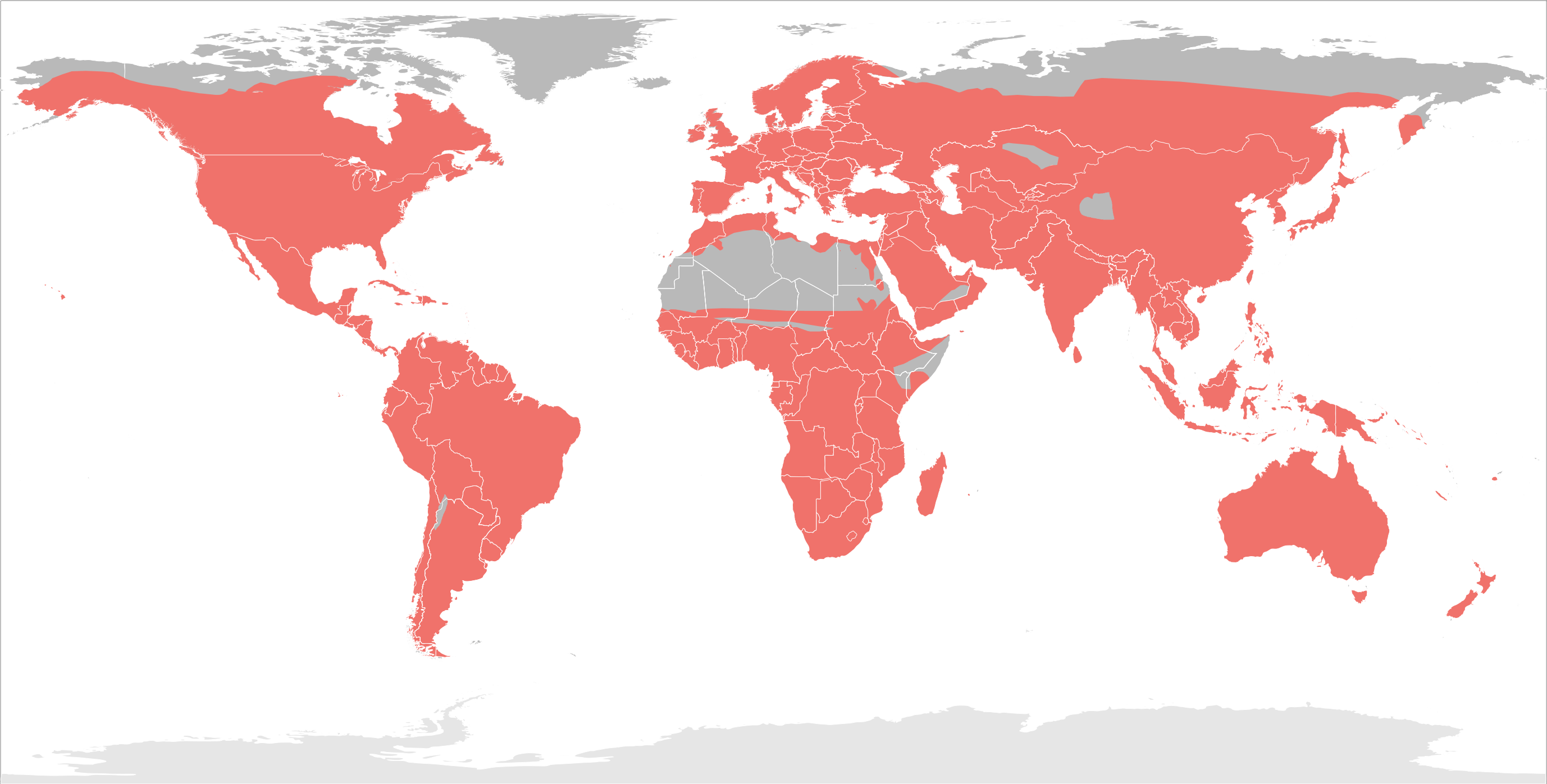
Vespertilionidae distribution

Vesper bats (family Vespertilionidae) are small bats classified in the order Chiroptera.

- For bats in the subfamily Kerivoulinae, see list of kerivoulines
- For bats in the subfamily Myotinae, see list of myotines
- For bats in the subfamily Murininae, see list of murinines
- For bats in the subfamily Vespertilioninae, see list of vespertilionines
