= Murina guilleni =

Scientific classification
- Kingdom: Animalia
- Phylum: Chordata
- Class: Mammalia
- Order: Chiroptera
- Family: Vespertilionidae
- Genus: Murina
- Species: M. guilleni

Binomial name
- Murina guilleni Soisook, Karapan, Satasook, Vu Dinh Thong, Anwarali Khan, Maryanto, Csorba, Furey, Aul, & P. J. J. Bates, 2013

Species of bat

Murina guilleni is a species of vesper bat found in Thailand and the Nicobar Islands.

== Taxonomy and systematics ==
Murina guilleni was described as a new species in 2013. Its description was the result of a taxonomic split of the round-eared tube-nosed bat (Murina cyclotis). The holotype had been collected in 2010 by P. Soisook at Rajjaprabha Dam in the Surat Thani province of Thailand. The eponym for the species name guilleni is Antonio Guillén-Servent who, in 1997, was the first to collect this species.

There are two subspecies: the nominate subspecies, Murina guilleni guilleni, which is in Thailand, and M. g. nicobarensis, which is in the Nicobar Islands.

== Description ==
Murina guilleni is considered a medium-sized member of the genus Murina. Its forearm length ranges from 31.9–35.9 mm (1.26–1.41 in), with an average length of 34.0 mm (1.34 in). The fur on its back is bicolored: the roots of individual hairs are gray, while the tips are orangeish-brown. Its belly fur is dark gray, with hairs around the throat and chest tinged with orange.

== Echolocation ==
Murina guilleni echolocates to find its insect prey. Its echolocation calls are frequency modulated, meaning that they vary in pitch within the call. Based on recordings of two males, the frequency of maximum energy is from 120.1 to 155.7 kHz.The starting frequency of calls ranges from 175.0 to 184.0 kHz, while the ending frequency is 53.0–63.0 kHz.

== Range and habitat ==
Murina guilleni has been documented in forests in Southern Thailand and the Nicobar Islands.
