= Hill's roundleaf bat =

Conservation status
- Vulnerable (IUCN 3.1)

Scientific classification
- Kingdom: Animalia
- Phylum: Chordata
- Class: Mammalia
- Order: Chiroptera
- Family: Hipposideridae
- Genus: Hipposideros
- Species: H. edwardshilli

Binomial name
- Hipposideros edwardshilli Flannery & Colgan, 1993
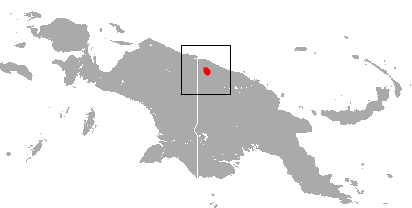
- Hill's roundleaf bat range

Species of bat

Hill's roundleaf bat (Hipposideros edwardshilli) is a species of bat in the family Hipposideridae. It is endemic to Papua New Guinea.

== Taxonomy ==
Hill's roundleaf bat was described as a new species in 1993 by Tim Flannery and Donald Colgan. The holotype had been collected in the Bewani Mountains near Imonda Station in 1990 by P. German and L. Seri. The eponym for the species name "edwardshilli" was British mammalogist John Edwards Hill, "in recognition of his outstanding contributions to bat taxonomy".

== Description ==
Individuals have a forearm length of 49.6–51 mm (1.95–2.01 in) and a very short tail length of 11.1–15 mm (0.44–0.59 in). It differs from all other Hipposideros species in its two club-like projections on its nose-leaf.

== Range and habitat ==
Hill's roundleaf bat is endemic to Papua New Guinea in Oceania. It has been documented at a narrow range of elevations from 200–300 m (660–980 ft) above sea level.

== Conservation ==
As of 2021, it is evaluated as a vulnerable species by the IUCN. It meets the criteria for this designation because it has a potentially limited habitat for roosting. Its area of occupancy is possibly less than 2,000 km^{2} (490,000 acres). Habitat loss is ongoing through deforestation. It has not been documented since its description in 1993.
