= Li Song =

Li Song or Song Li is the name of:

People surnamed Li

- Emperor Shunzong of Tang (761–806), emperor of the Tang dynasty
- Li Song (politician) (died 948), politician of Later Tang, Later Jin, Liao and Later Han dynasties during the Five Dynasties period
- Li Song (painter) (fl. 1190–1230), Song dynasty imperial court painter
- Song Li (bioengineer) (born 1965), Chinese-born bioengineering researcher at the University of California Los Angeles, USA
- Li Song (minister), (1358-1422) Ming dynasty Minister of Works

People surnamed Song

- Song Li (speed skater) (born 1981), Chinese speed skater
