= Fiona's tube-nosed bat =

Conservation status
- Least Concern (IUCN 3.1)

Scientific classification
- Kingdom: Animalia
- Phylum: Chordata
- Class: Mammalia
- Order: Chiroptera
- Family: Vespertilionidae
- Genus: Murina
- Species: M. fionae

Binomial name
- Murina fionae Francis & Eger, 2012
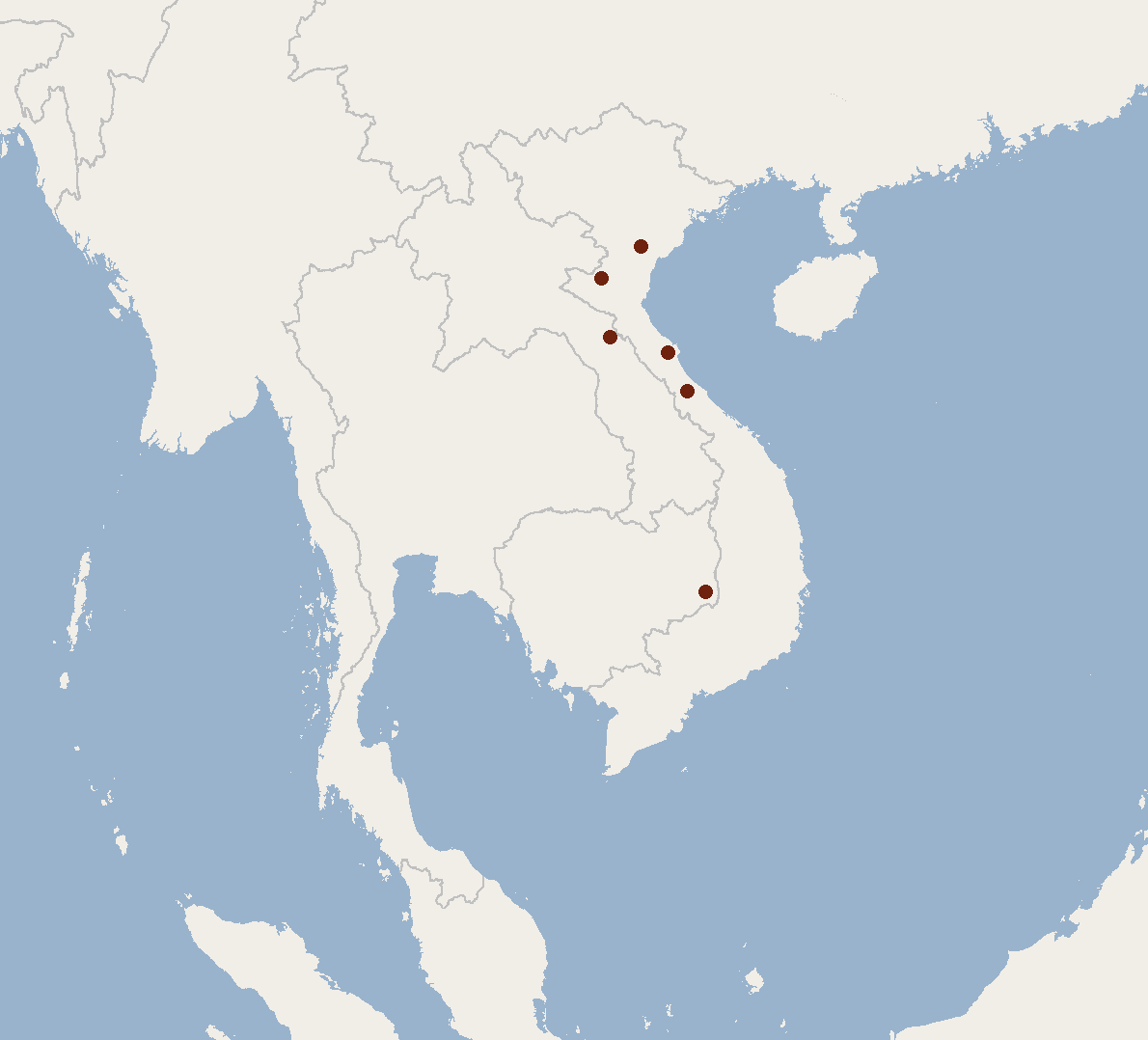
- Distribution of the species (Murina fionae)

Species of bat

Fiona's tube-nosed bat (Murina fionae) is a species of vesper bats (Vespertilionidae). It is found in Vietnam, Cambodia, and Laos.
