= Annam tube-nosed bat =

Conservation status
- Least Concern (IUCN 3.1)

Scientific classification
- Kingdom: Animalia
- Phylum: Chordata
- Class: Mammalia
- Order: Chiroptera
- Family: Vespertilionidae
- Genus: Murina
- Species: M. annamitica

Binomial name
- Murina annamitica Francis & Eger, 2012

Species of bat

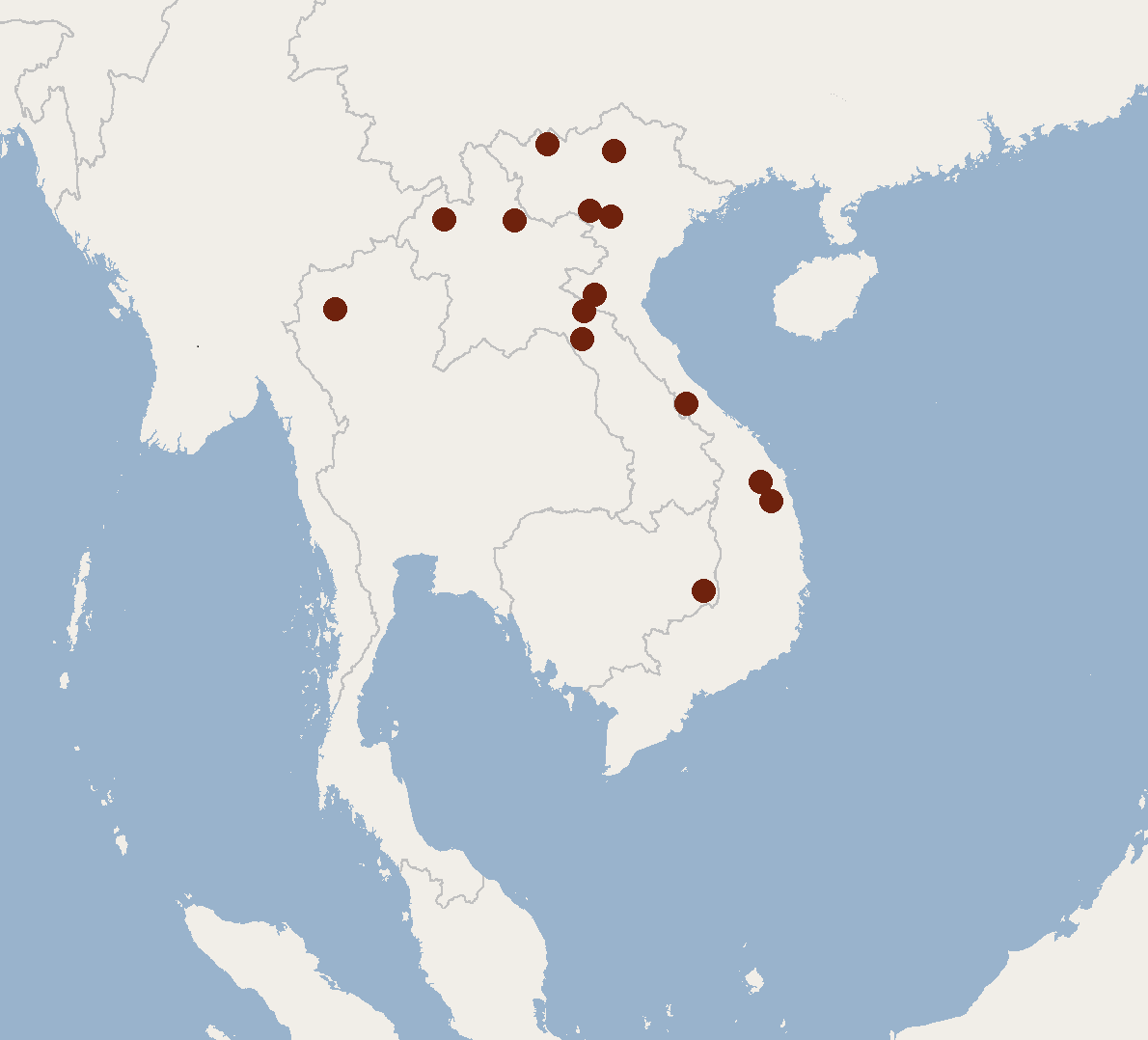

The Annam tube-nosed bat (Murina annamitica) is a species of bat in the family Vespertilionidae. It is found in Laos, Thailand and Vietnam.
