= Lorelie's tube-nosed bat =

Conservation status
- Data Deficient (IUCN 3.1)

Scientific classification
- Kingdom: Animalia
- Phylum: Chordata
- Class: Mammalia
- Order: Chiroptera
- Family: Vespertilionidae
- Genus: Murina
- Species: M. lorelieae

Binomial name
- Murina lorelieae Eger & Lim, 2011

Species of mammal

Lorelie's tube-nosed bat (Murina lorelieae) is a species of vesper bat in the family Vespertilionidae. It is endemic to southern China, where it is known only from Yunnan and Guangxi provinces. It is named after chiropterist Lorelie Mitchell.

It is a small Murina with a reddish-brown dorsum, with a black mask on the face. It closely resembles the sympatric round-eared tube-nosed bat (M. cyclotis).

It is possibly affected by habitat loss due to logging.
