= Taiwan tube-nosed bat =

Conservation status
- Least Concern (IUCN 3.1)

Scientific classification
- Kingdom: Animalia
- Phylum: Chordata
- Class: Mammalia
- Order: Chiroptera
- Family: Vespertilionidae
- Genus: Murina
- Species: M. puta

Binomial name
- Murina puta Kishida, 1924

Species of bat

The Taiwan tube-nosed bat (Murina puta) is a species of vesper bat in the family Vespertilionidae. It is found only in Taiwan. It is a close relative of Hutton's tube-nosed bat, and might even be the same species.
