= Golden-haired tube-nosed bat =

Conservation status
- Data Deficient (IUCN 3.1)

Scientific classification
- Kingdom: Animalia
- Phylum: Chordata
- Class: Mammalia
- Order: Chiroptera
- Family: Vespertilionidae
- Genus: Murina
- Species: M. chrysochaetes

Binomial name
- Murina chrysochaetes Eger & Lim, 2011

Species of bat

The golden-haired tube-nosed bat (Murina chrysochaetes) is a species of vesper bat in the family Vespertilionidae. it is native to southern China and northern Vietnam, where it is thought to be restricted to evergreen forests on the highlands.

It is a very small species of Murina with a narrower braincase and wider canines than other species, and a pelage coloration consisting of black and golden bands, with the golden bands giving it its specific epithet, chrysochaetes.

It is known from only three specimens collected on the border of both countries. It is possibly affected by habitat loss due to logging.
