= Bronze tube-nosed bat =

Conservation status
- Vulnerable (IUCN 3.1)

Scientific classification
- Kingdom: Animalia
- Phylum: Chordata
- Class: Mammalia
- Order: Chiroptera
- Family: Vespertilionidae
- Genus: Murina
- Species: M. aenea

Binomial name
- Murina aenea Hill, 1964
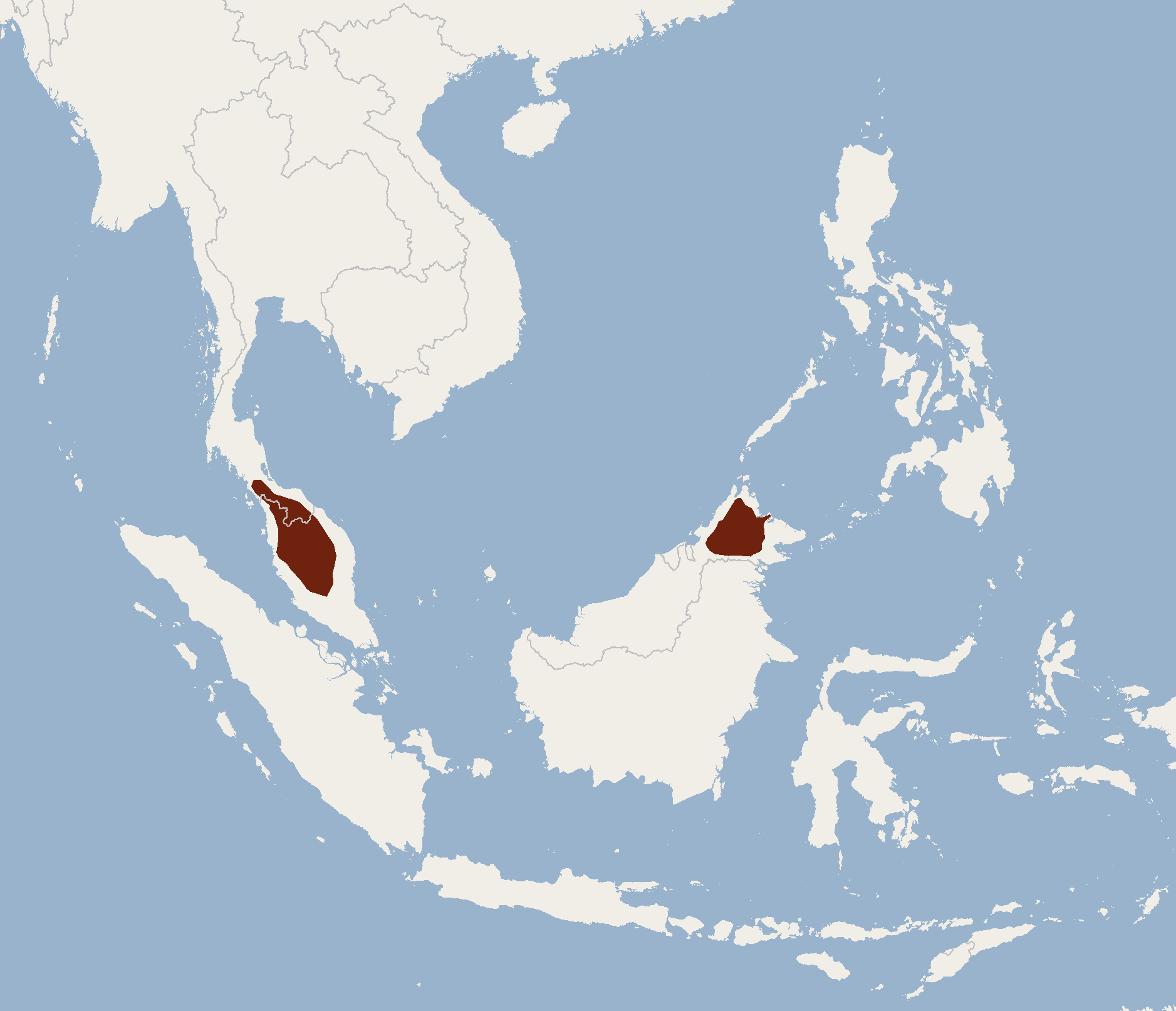

Species of bat

The bronze tube-nosed bat (Murina aenea) is a species of vesper bat in the family Vespertilionidae. It is found in Southeast Asia, including Brunei, Indonesia, Malaysia, and Thailand.

== Taxonomy ==
The bronze tube-nosed bat was described as a new species in 1964 by British mammalogist John Edwards Hill. The holotype had been collected near the village of Janda Baik in Peninsular Malaysia.

== Description ==
It is considered a medium-sized member of the genus Murina. Its forearm length ranges from 34.7–37.4 mm (1.37–1.47 in). The ears are 12.7–15.0 mm (0.50–0.59 in) long, relatively big for the genus, with round tips and smooth outer edges. Individuals are bicolored, with their backs dark brown and bellies dark gray. Its hairs are frosted golden orange on the back and yellowish brown on the belly.

== Biology ==
It is insectivorous and forages for its prey in cluttered forest understories. It roosts in vegetation during the day. It is not often encountered by researchers, so little is known about its life cycle timing. A pregnant female was documented in June and a lactating female was once found in March.

== Range and habitat ==
The bronze tube-nosed bat is found in Southeast Asia, including Brunei, Indonesia, Malaysia, and Thailand. Its habitat includes lowland forests of 0–1,200 m (0–3,937 ft) above sea level.

== Conservation ==
As of 2020, it is considered a vulnerable species by the IUCN. It meets the criteria for this classification due to its ongoing suspected population decline of at least 30% from 2005-2020. Its primary threat is habitat destruction from deforestation for logging and agriculture, as well as wildfires. Its population is likely to decline further as more habitat is lost.
