= Gilded tube-nosed bat =

Conservation status
- Vulnerable (IUCN 3.1)

Scientific classification
- Kingdom: Animalia
- Phylum: Chordata
- Class: Mammalia
- Infraclass: Placentalia
- Order: Chiroptera
- Family: Vespertilionidae
- Genus: Murina
- Species: M. rozendaali

Binomial name
- Murina rozendaali Hill & Francis, 1984
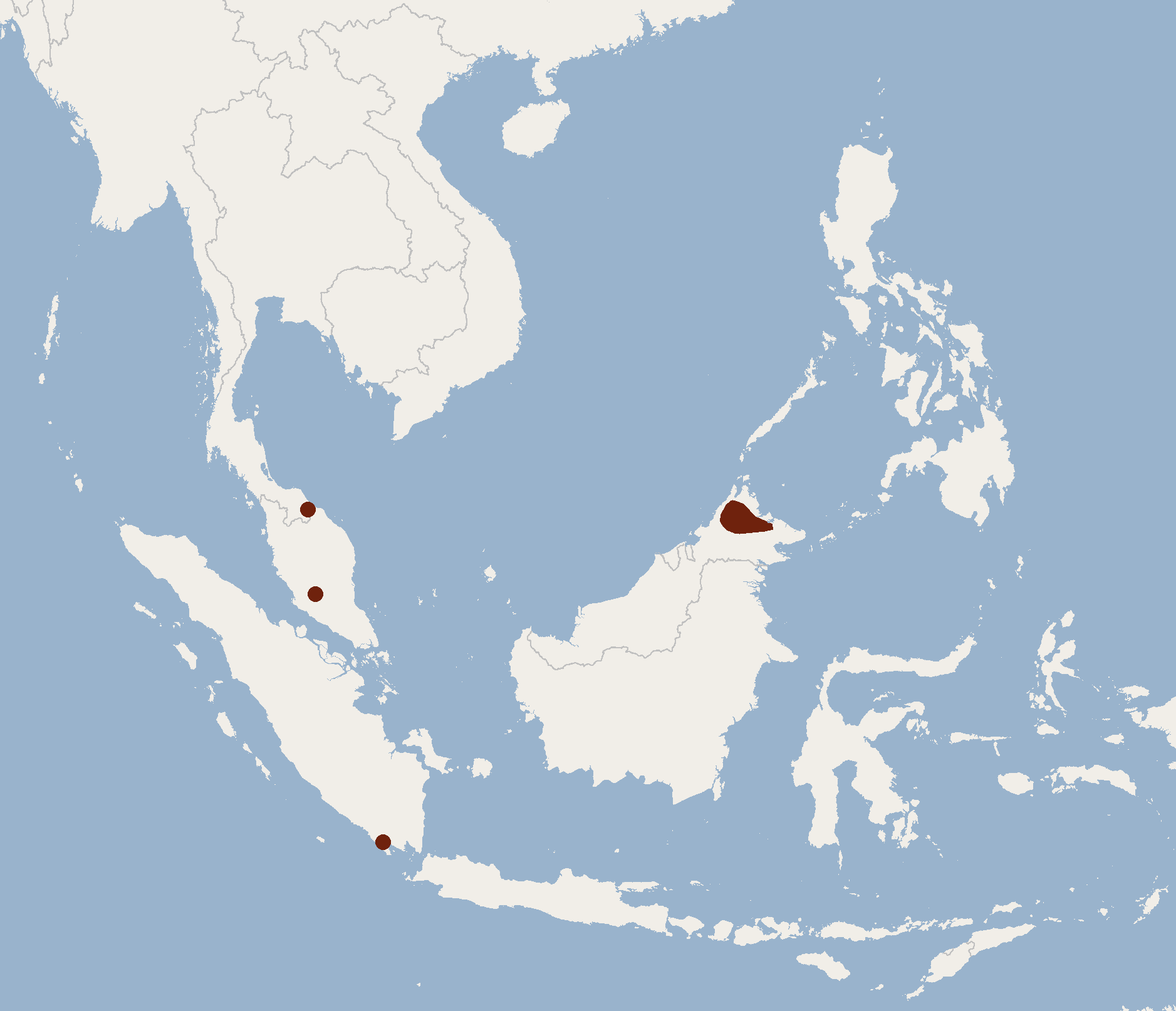
- Distribution (brown), within South-East Asia

Species of bat

The gilded tube-nosed bat (Murina rozendaali) is a species of vesper bat in the family Vespertilionidae.

== Distribution ==
This species is native to South-East Asia. In particular, it inhabits Borneo and minor pockets of Peninsular Malaysia and southern Sumatra. It has been recorded from the far south of Thailand, near the border with Malaysia, but it is unknown whether this population remains extant.
