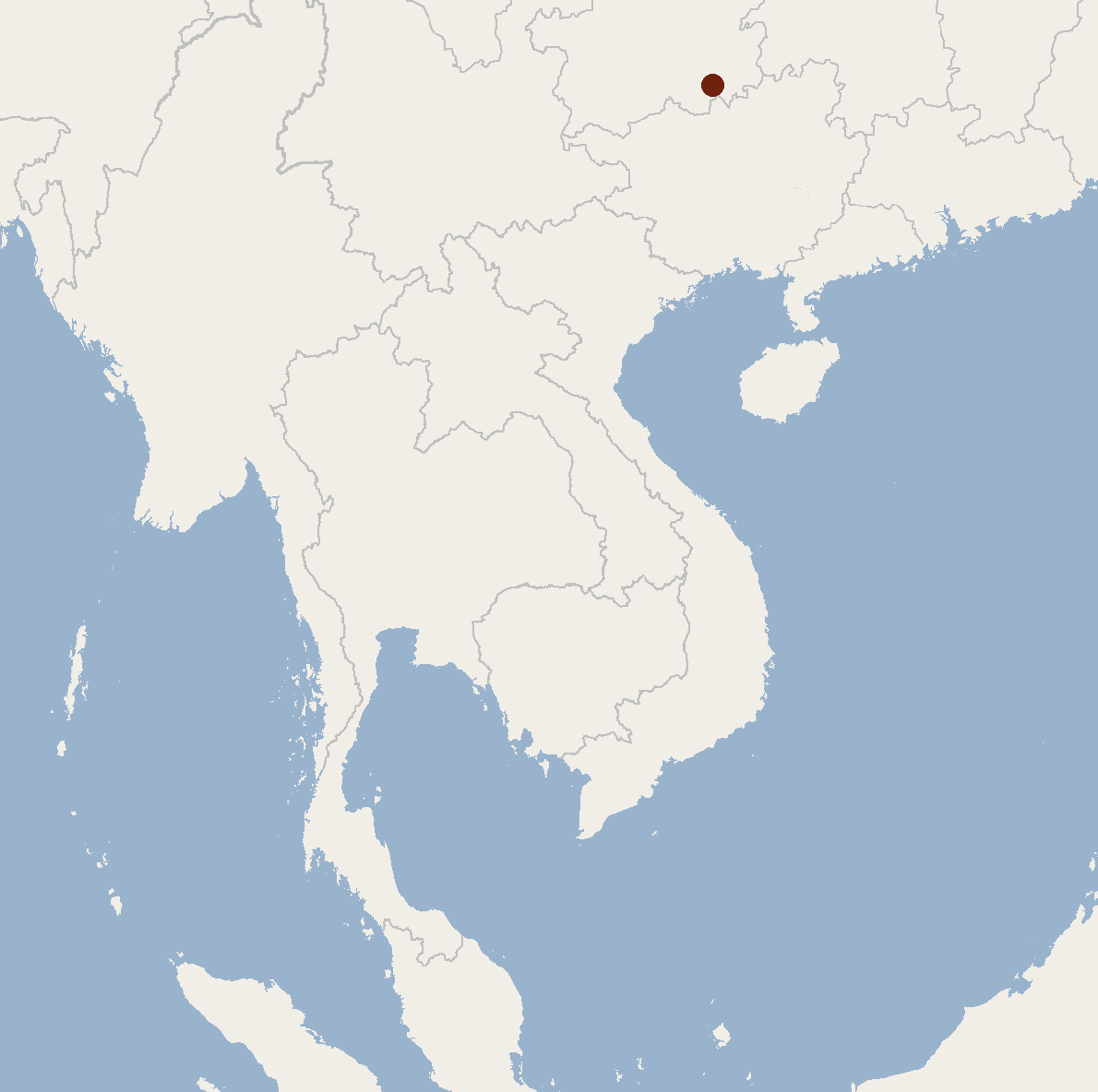
- Distribution of Shuipu tube-nosed bat

Conservation status
- Data Deficient (IUCN 3.1)

Scientific classification
- Kingdom: Animalia
- Phylum: Chordata
- Class: Mammalia
- Order: Chiroptera
- Family: Vespertilionidae
- Genus: Murina
- Species: M. shuipuensis

Binomial name
- Murina shuipuensis Eger & Lim, 2011

= Shuipu tube-nosed bat =

Species of mammal

The Shuipu tube-nosed bat or Shuifu tube-nosed bat (Murina shuipuensis) is a species of vesper bat in the family Vespertilionidae. It is endemic to southern China, where it is known only from Guangxi province. It is named after the type locality, Shuipu Village.

It has golden-brown fur with a striking orange-yellow underside, along with a small skull with a deep, pronounced rostrum. It resembles the much larger greater tube-nosed bat (M. leucogaster).
