= Harpiola =

Scientific classification
- Domain: Eukaryota
- Kingdom: Animalia
- Phylum: Chordata
- Class: Mammalia
- Order: Chiroptera
- Family: Vespertilionidae
- Subfamily: Murininae
- Genus: Harpiola; Thomas, 1915

Species
- Harpiola grisea; Harpiola isodon

Genus of bats

Harpiola is a genus (or possibly subgenus) of vesper bats within the subfamily Murininae. It contains Peters's tube-nosed bat (Harpiola grisea) and the Formosan golden tube-nosed bat (Harpiola isodon).
