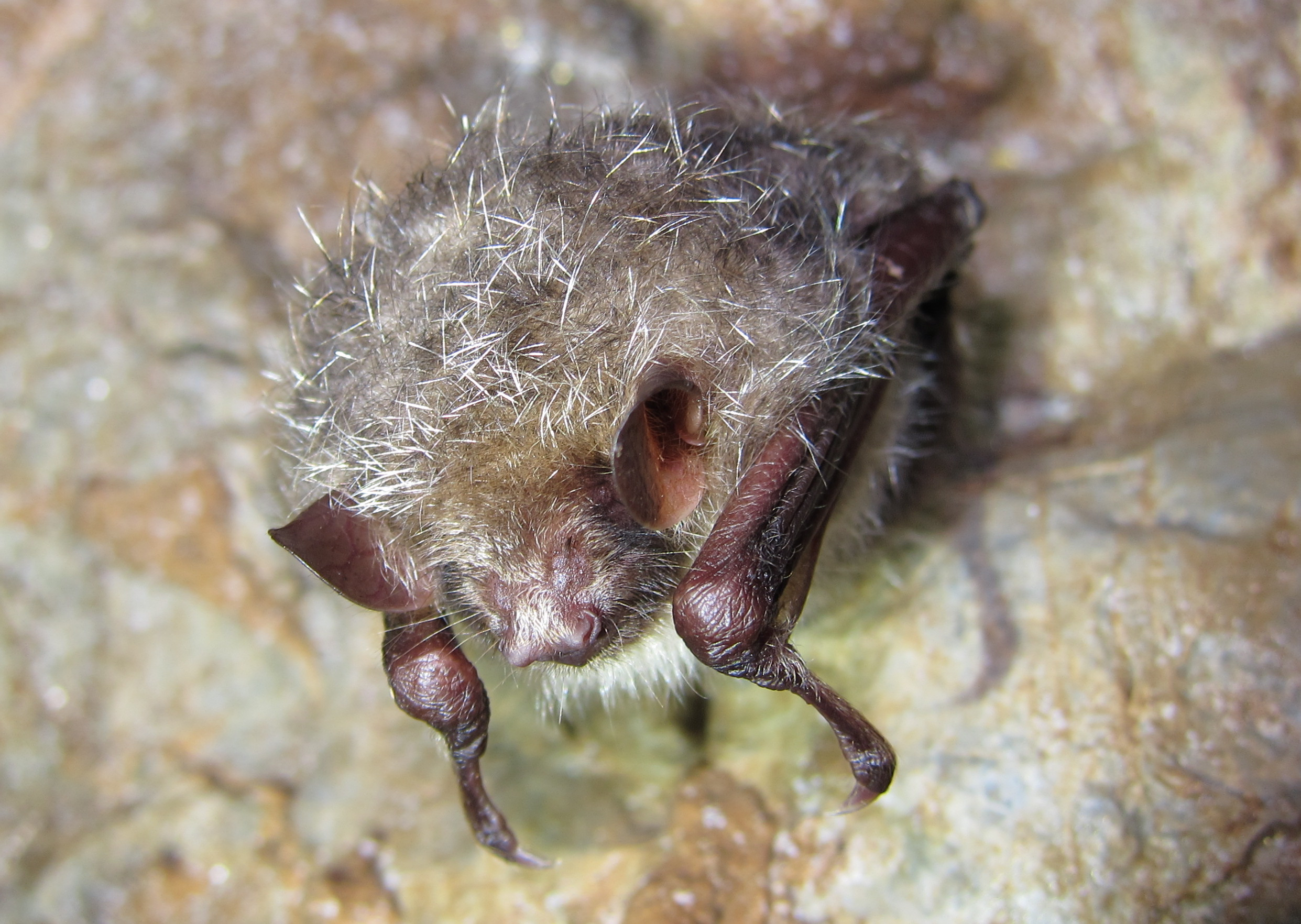
- Hilgendorf's tube-nosed bat (M. hilgendorfi)

Scientific classification
- Kingdom: Animalia
- Phylum: Chordata
- Class: Mammalia
- Order: Chiroptera
- Family: Vespertilionidae
- Subfamily: Murininae
- Genus: Murina; Gray, 1842

Type species
- Vespertilio suillus

Species
- See text

= Murina =

Genus of vesper bats

Murina is a genus of vesper bats. They are found throughout temperate and tropical regions of Asia.

== Taxonomy ==
Species list based on American Society of Mammalogists and ITIS:

- Murina aenea - bronze tube-nosed bat
- Murina alvarezi - Alvarez's tube-nosed bat
- Murina annamitica - Annam tube-nosed bat
- Murina aurata - little tube-nosed bat
- Murina balaensis - Bala tube-nosed bat
- Murina baletei - Balete's tube-nosed bat
- Murina beelzebub - Beelzebub's tube-nosed bat
- Murina bicolor - bicolored tube-nosed bat
- Murina chrysochaetes - golden-haired tube-nosed bat
- Murina cyclotis - round-eared tube-nosed bat
- Murina eleryi - Elery's tube-nosed bat
- Murina fanjingshanensis (He, Xiao & Zhou, 2016) - Fang He tube-nosed bat
- Murina feae - Fea's tube-nosed bat
- Murina fionae - Fiona's tube-nosed bat
- Murina florium - flute-nosed bat
- Murina fusca - dusky tube-nosed bat
- Murina gracilis - slender tube-nosed bat
- Murina guilleni - Guillen's tube-nosed bat
- Murina harpioloides - Da Lat tube-nosed bat
- Murina harrisoni - Harrison's tube-nosed bat
- Murina hilgendorfi - Hilgendorf's tube-nosed bat
- Murina hkakaboraziensis - Hkakabo Razi tube-nosed bat
- Murina hilonghilong - Hilong-hilong tube-nosed bat
- Murina huttoni - Hutton's tube-nosed bat
- Murina jaintiana - Jaintia tube-nosed bat
- Murina jinchui - Jinchu's tube-nosed bat
- Murina kontumensis (Son, Csorba, Tu, & Motokawa, 2015) - Kon Tum tube-nosed bat
- Murina leucogaster - greater tube-nosed bat
- Murina liboensis - Libo tube-nosed bat
- Murina lorelieae - Lorelie's tube-nosed bat
- Murina luzonensis - Luzon tube-nosed bat
- Murina mindorensis - Mindoro tube-nosed bat
- Murina peninsularis - peninsular tube-nosed bat
- Murina philippinensis - Philippine tube-nosed bat
- Murina pluvialis - rainforest tube-nosed bat
- Murina puta - Taiwan tube-nosed bat
- Murina recondita - hidden tube-nosed bat
- Murina rozendaali - gilded tube-nosed bat
- Murina ryukyuana - Ryukyu tube-nosed bat
- Murina shuipuensis - Shuipu tube-nosed bat
- Murina suilla - Brown tube-nosed bat
- Murina tenebrosa - gloomy tube-nosed bat
- Murina tubinaris - Scully's tube-nosed bat
- Murina ussuriensis - Ussuri tube-nosed bat
- Murina walstoni - Walston's tube-nosed bat
