= Jaintia tube-nosed bat =

Conservation status
- Data Deficient (IUCN 3.1)

Scientific classification
- Kingdom: Animalia
- Phylum: Chordata
- Class: Mammalia
- Order: Chiroptera
- Family: Vespertilionidae
- Genus: Murina
- Species: M. jaintiana

Binomial name
- Murina jaintiana Ruedi, Biswas, & Csorba, 2012

Species of bat

The Jaintia tube-nosed bat (Murina jaintiana) is a species of vesper bats (Vespertilionidae). It is found in India and Myanmar.
