= Formosan golden tube-nosed bat =

Conservation status
- Least Concern (IUCN 3.1)

Scientific classification
- Kingdom: Animalia
- Phylum: Chordata
- Class: Mammalia
- Order: Chiroptera
- Family: Vespertilionidae
- Genus: Harpiola
- Species: H. isodon

Binomial name
- Harpiola isodon Kuo, Fang, Csorba & Lee, 2006

Species of bat

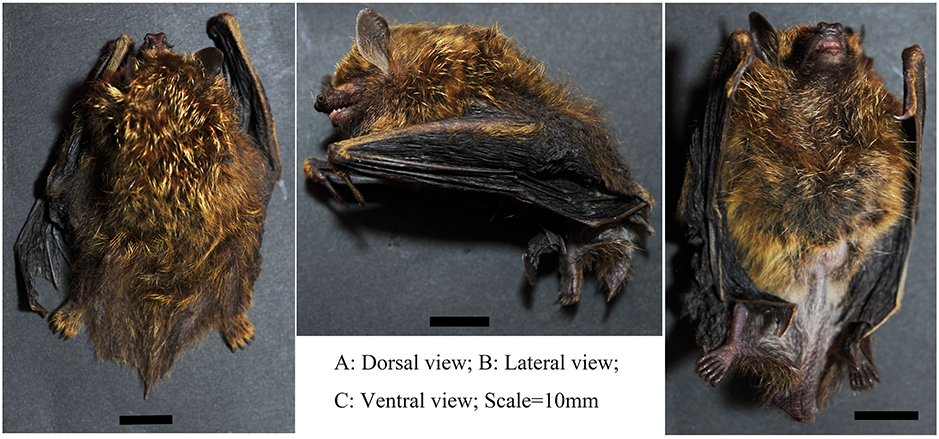
Formosan golden tube-nosed bat

The Formosan golden tube-nosed bat (Harpiola isodon) is native to the high-altitude regions of Taiwan.

== Taxonomy and etymology ==
It was described as a new species in 2006. The holotype had been collected in Yuli Wildlife Refuge in Zhuoxi, Taiwan in 1998. Its species name "isodon" means "equal-toothed". The researchers who described the species chose this name because of the almost-equal basal area of the canines, first premolars, and second premolars.

== Description ==
It is a medium-sized tube-nosed bat, with an average forearm length of 31–36 mm (1.2–1.4 in). Its guard hairs have shiny, golden tips, inspiring its common name. Its dorsal fur is very long, while the ventral fur is shorter. Its fur texture is woolly. Individual hairs are dark brown at their bases, bright yellow in the middle, and dark brown again at their tips. Its uropatagium is densely furred both above and below. Its ears are 12.5–13 mm (0.49–0.51 in) long; its tragi are 6.5–8 mm (0.26–0.31 in) long.

== Range and habitat ==
It has been documented in the mountainous regions of Taiwan, from elevations of 1,000–2,400 m (3,300–7,900 ft) above sea level. In 2006, it was published that the species had been documented in Vietnam for the first time.

== Conservation ==
It is currently assessed as least concern by the IUCN.
