= John Edwards Hill =

English zoologist

John Edwards Hill (11 June 1928 – 6 May 1997) was a British mammalogist who described 24 species and 26 subspecies during his career.

== Early life and education ==
Hill was born on 11 June 1928 in the small hamlet of Colemans Hatch in East Sussex, England. He was the only child of Marjorie Edwards and her husband Albert Hill. He attended East Grinstead Grammar School on scholarship. During World War II, his father worked as a gardener and his mother worked as a housekeeper. Hill finished Grammar School after the war in 1946 at eighteen years old.

== Career ==
After finishing school, Hill joined the Air Ministry's Meteorological Office as a Meteorological Assistant. He then served in the Royal Air Force for two years as a Meteorological Assistant, during which he traveled to Japan, Singapore, and the Nicobar Islands. In 1948, he began working as an Assistant Experimental Officer at the British Museum (Natural History)'s Department of Zoology. He retired from the Museum 40 years later in 1988. From 1974 to his death in 1997, Hill was on the editorial board of the journal Mammalia.

Hill was well-regarded for his work with bats; Australian mammalogist Tim Flannery referred to him as a "bat expert." He described a number of bat species, including Kitti's hog-nosed bat. He also published major revisions of several bat genera, including Hipposideros, Philetor, Laephotis, Scotoecus, Hesperoptenus, Mystacina, as well as the mouse-tailed bat family, Rhinopomatidae.

Altogether, Hill described 24 new species of mammal and 26 subspecies. Of that total, 13 were rodents and 37 were bats.

== Awards and honors ==
In 1985, the American Society of Mammalogists elected Hill as an honorary member. Several species of mammal are named after Hill, including the Hills' horseshoe bat, Hill's sheath-tailed bat, Hill's roundleaf bat, Sturnira koopmanhilli, and Hill's shrew.

== Selected publications ==
- Hill, J. E.; Smith, J. D. (1984). Bats: A Natural History. University of Texas Press. ISBN 9780292707528.
- Corbet, G. B.; Hill, J. E. (1980). A world list of mammalian species. Comstock Pub. Associates. ISBN 9780801412608.
- Hill, J. E. (1990). "A memoir and bibliography of Michael Rogers Oldfield Thomas, FRS". Bulletin of the British Museum (Natural History). 18.

== Personal life and death ==
Hill married Brenda Morphew in 1955; they had a daughter, Sandra. He died on 6 May 1997.
