= Hkakabo Razi tube-nosed bat =

Hkakabo Razi Tube-nosed Bat

Scientific classification
- Kingdom: Animalia
- Phylum: Chordata
- Class: Mammalia
- Order: Chiroptera
- Family: Vespertilionidae
- Genus: Murina
- Species: M. hkakaboraziensis

Binomial name
- Murina hkakaboraziensis Soisook, Thaw, Kyaw, Lin Oo, Pimsai, Suarez-Rubio & Renner, 2017

Species of bat

The Hkakabo Razi tube-nosed bat (Murina hkakaboraziensis), also known colloquially as the Lance Bass bat is a species of vesper bat in the family Vespertilionidae. It is found only in Myanmar. The bat earned its nickname due to its spiky blonde pelage, which reminded people of Lance Bass, a member of the boy band NSYNC.
