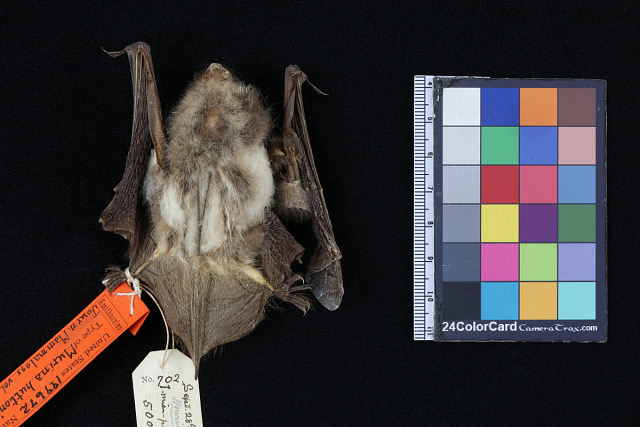

Conservation status
- Data Deficient (IUCN 3.1)

Scientific classification
- Kingdom: Animalia
- Phylum: Chordata
- Class: Mammalia
- Order: Chiroptera
- Family: Vespertilionidae
- Genus: Murina
- Species: M. fusca

Binomial name
- Murina fusca Sowerby, 1922

= Dusky tube-nosed bat =

Dusky Tube-Nosed Bat

Species of bat

The dusky tube-nosed bat (Murina fusca) is a species of vesper bat in the family Vespertilionidae. It is found only in China.
