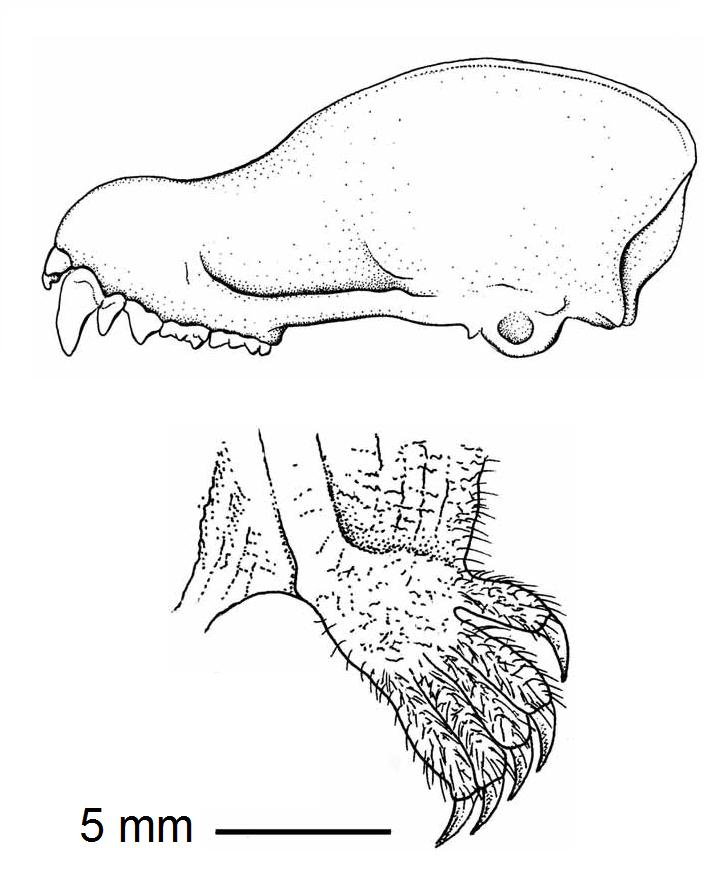

Conservation status
- Least Concern (IUCN 3.1)

Scientific classification
- Kingdom: Animalia
- Phylum: Chordata
- Class: Mammalia
- Order: Chiroptera
- Family: Vespertilionidae
- Genus: Murina
- Species: M. harrisoni

Binomial name
- Murina harrisoni Csorba & Bates 2005
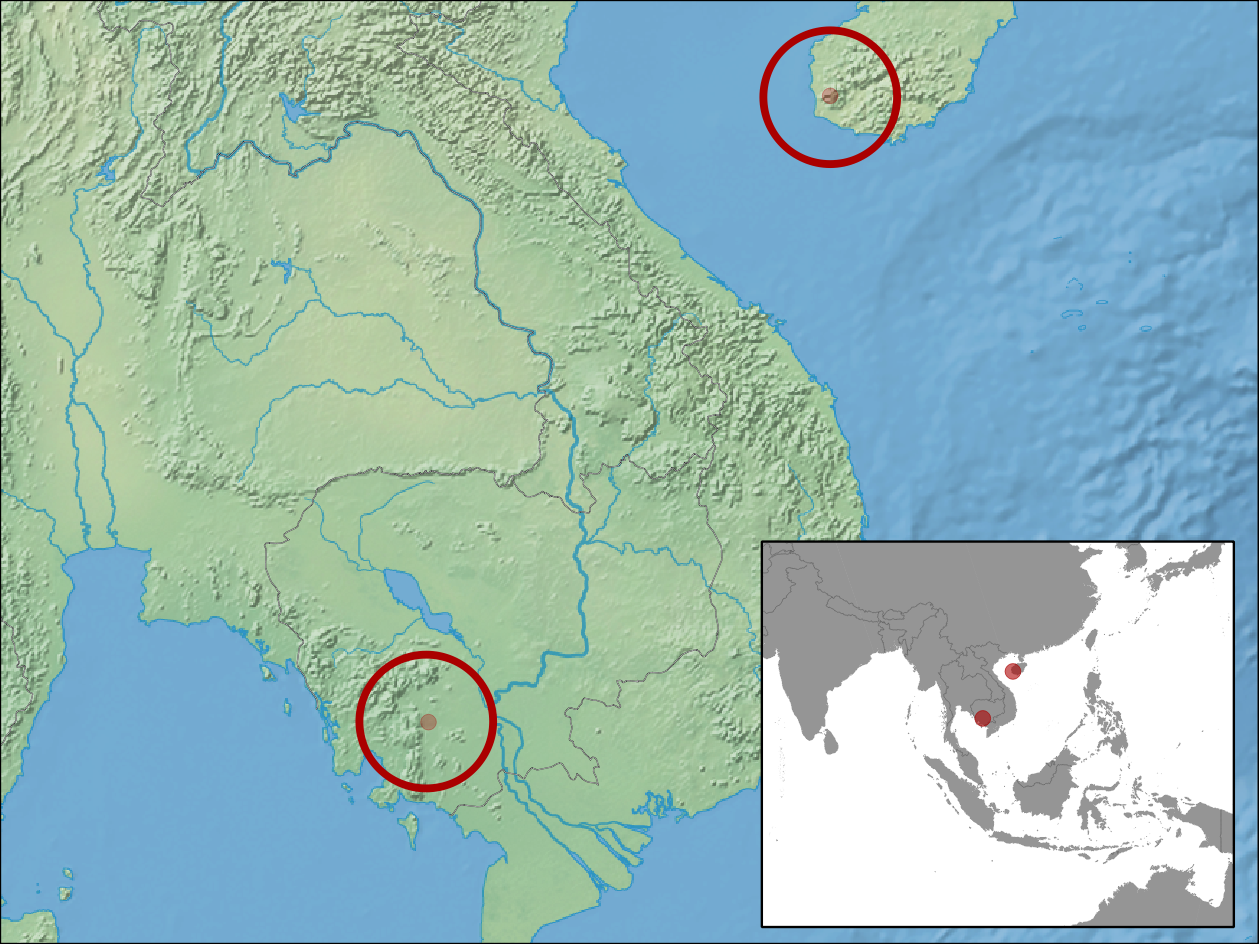

= Harrison's tube-nosed bat =

Species of bat

Harrison's tube-nosed bat (Murina harrisoni) is a species of vesper bats (Vespertilionidae). Within the genus Murina, it belongs to the so-called 'cyclotis-group'.

This species was only recently discovered and described. It is characterised by the attachment point of the plagiopatagium, its large skull size, the distinctive shape of the rostrum, and the relative sizes of the upper incisors. It is known from Kirirom National Park, Cambodia where it was collected in disturbed semi-evergreen gallery forests. It is also recorded from Thailand.
