= Hutton's tube-nosed bat =

Conservation status
- Least Concern (IUCN 3.1)

Scientific classification
- Kingdom: Animalia
- Phylum: Chordata
- Class: Mammalia
- Order: Chiroptera
- Family: Vespertilionidae
- Genus: Murina
- Species: M. huttoni

Binomial name
- Murina huttoni (Peters, 1872)
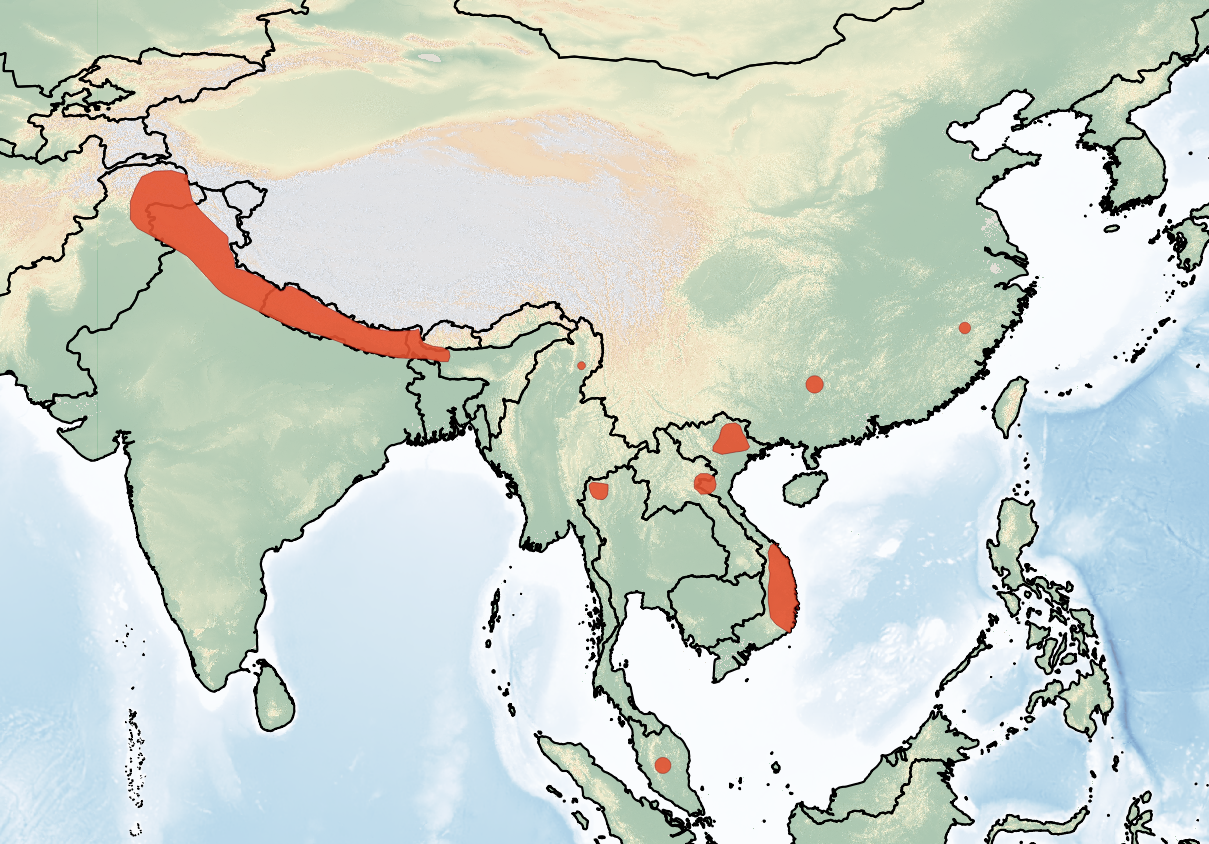

Species of bat

Hutton's tube-nosed bat (Murina huttoni) is a species of vesper bat in the family Vespertilionidae. It can be found in the following countries: Bhutan, China, India, Laos, Malaysia, Myanmar, Nepal, Pakistan, Thailand, and Viet Nam. It lives within an elevation of 1450 m to 2500 m. In Southeast Asia, the bat is considered to be uncommon. The bat is known to live in forests, roosting among the leaves of banana trees. Its habitat is threatened by deforestation for firewood and timber, as well as conversion to agricultural land.
