= Bicolored tube-nosed bat =

Conservation status
- Least Concern (IUCN 3.1)

Scientific classification
- Kingdom: Animalia
- Phylum: Chordata
- Class: Mammalia
- Order: Chiroptera
- Family: Vespertilionidae
- Genus: Murina
- Species: M. bicolor

Binomial name
- Murina bicolor Kuo, Fang, Csorba & Lee, 2009

Species of bat

The bicolored tube-nosed bat (Murina bicolor) is a species of vesper bat endemic to Taiwan.

== Taxonomy and etymology ==
It was described as a new species in 2009 by Kuo et al. The holotype was collected in 2002 in Taroko National Park. Its species name "bicolor" refers to the difference in pelage color of its dorsal and ventral sides.

== Description ==
It has dark coloration around its muzzle, eyes, and lower forehead, creating the appearance of a "mask." Its forearm length is 37–42 mm (1.5–1.7 in). Its dorsal fur is reddish brown, while its ventral fur is yellowish.

== Range and habitat ==
It is endemic to Taiwan. It has been documented at elevations of 400–3,350 m (1,310–10,990 ft) above sea level.

== Conservation ==
As of 2017, it is assessed as a least-concern species by the IUCN. It meets the criteria for this classification because there is no evidence that its population is declining. Its range also includes protected areas.
