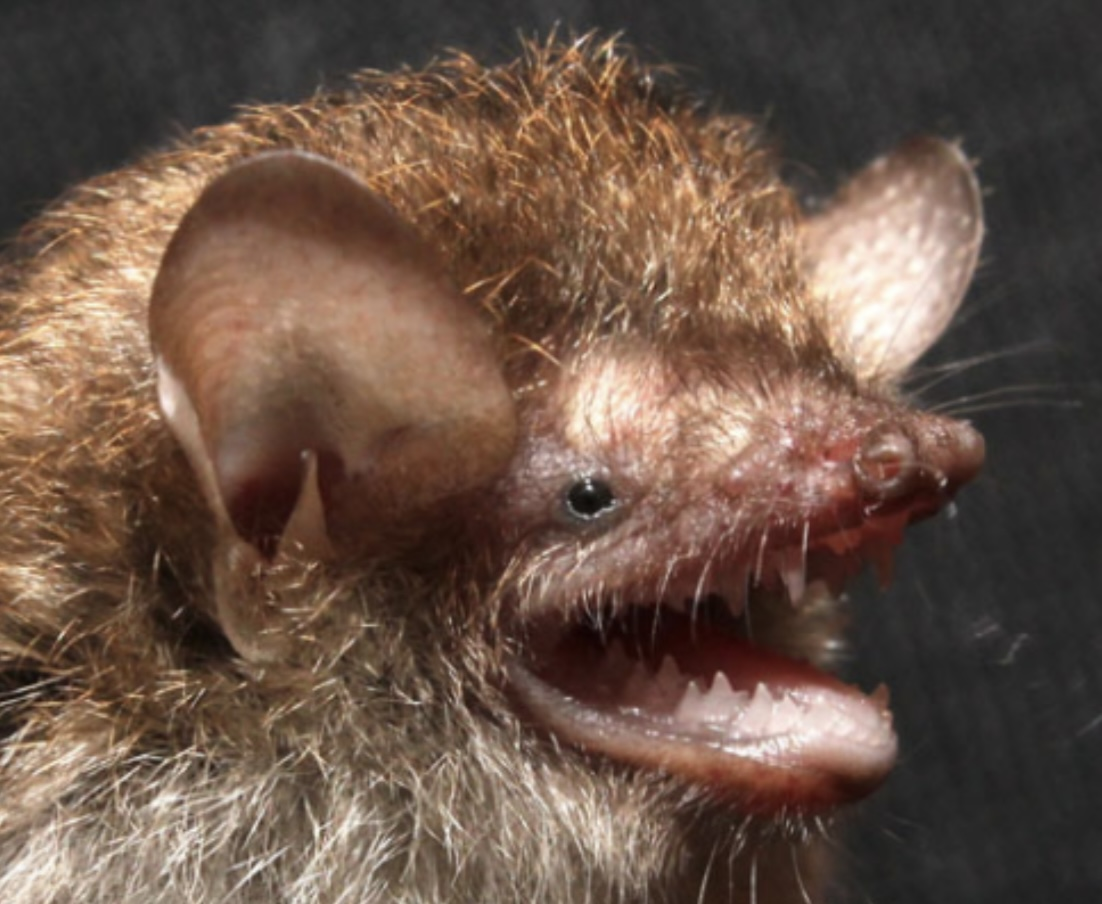

Conservation status
- Least Concern (IUCN 3.1)

Scientific classification
- Kingdom: Animalia
- Phylum: Chordata
- Class: Mammalia
- Order: Chiroptera
- Family: Vespertilionidae
- Genus: Murina
- Species: M. suilla

Binomial name
- Murina suilla Temminck, 1840
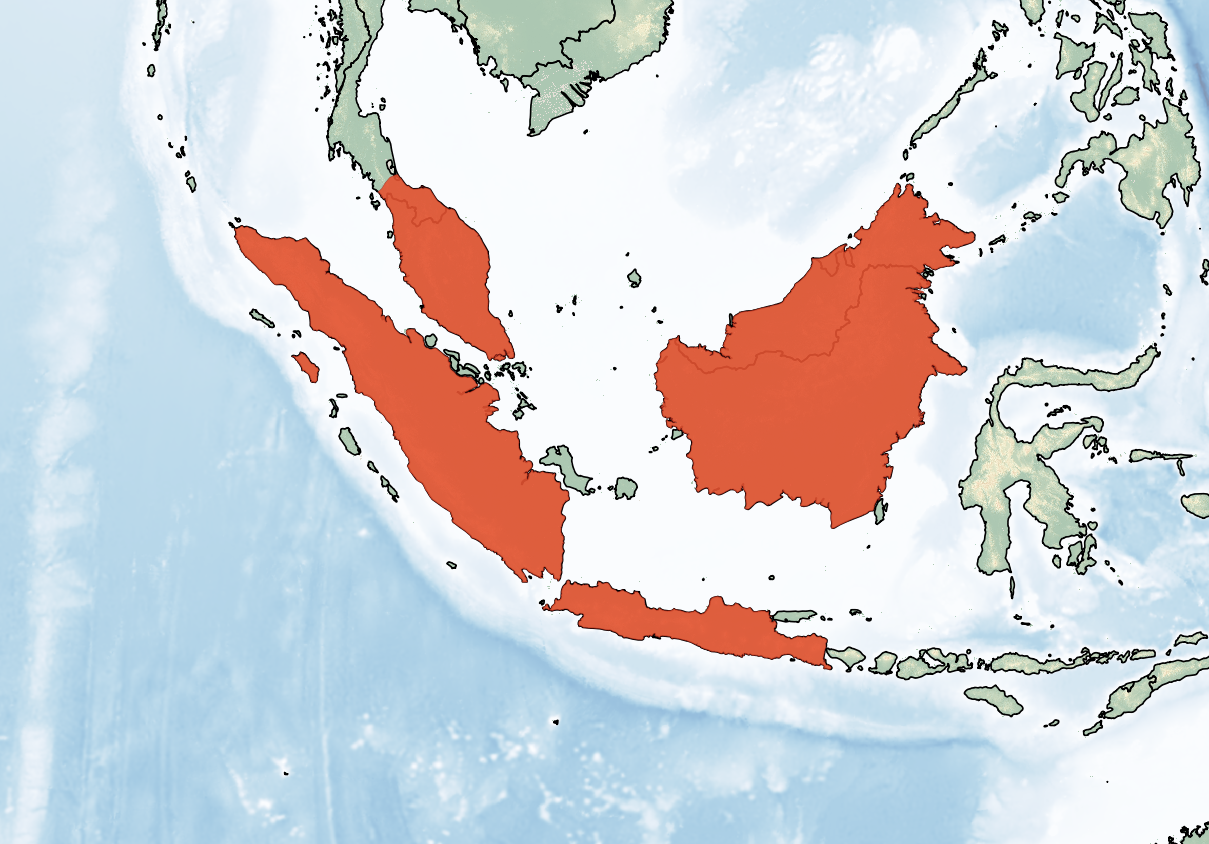

= Brown tube-nosed bat =

Species of bat

The brown tube-nosed bat (Murina suilla) is a species of vesper bat in the family Vespertilionidae. It can be found in the following countries: Brunei Darussalam, Indonesia, Malaysia, and the Philippines.
