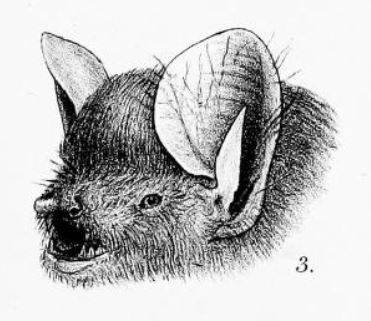

Conservation status
- Least Concern (IUCN 3.1)

Scientific classification
- Kingdom: Animalia
- Phylum: Chordata
- Class: Mammalia
- Order: Chiroptera
- Family: Vespertilionidae
- Genus: Murina
- Species: M. cyclotis

Binomial name
- Murina cyclotis Dobson, 1872
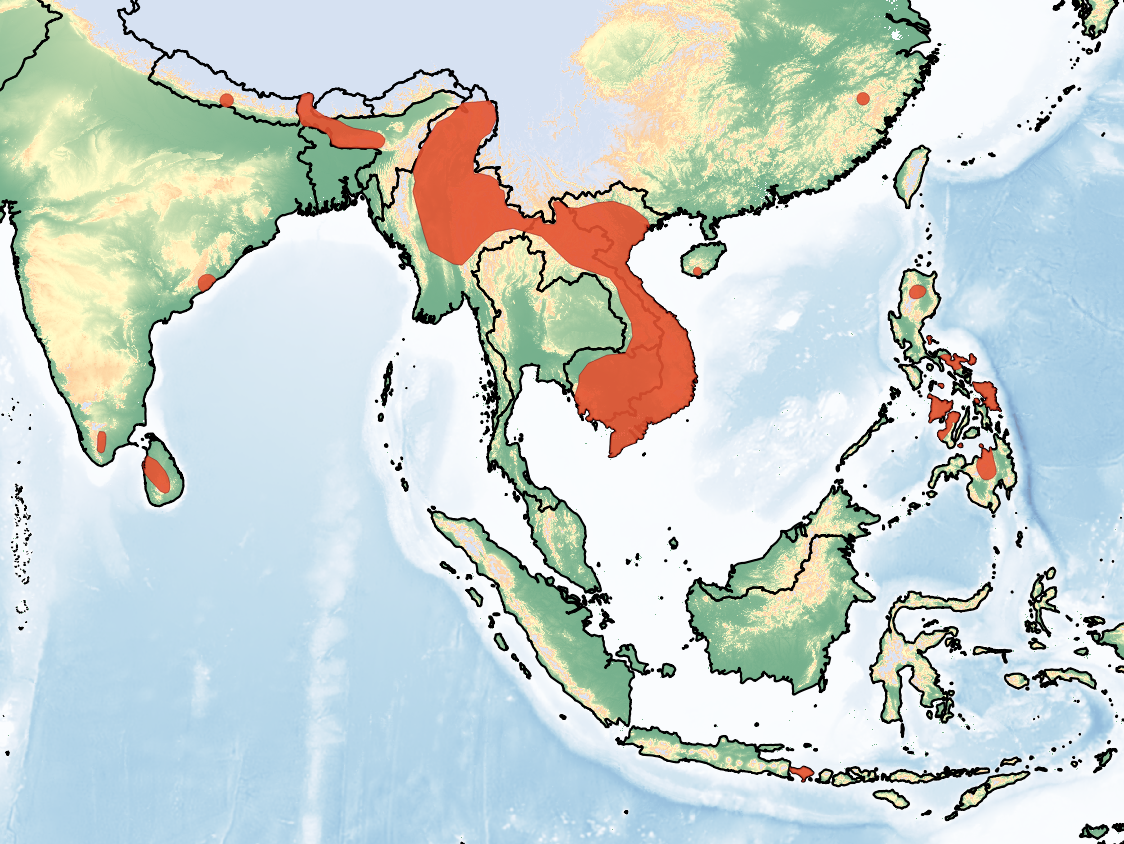

= Round-eared tube-nosed bat =

Species of bat

The round-eared tube-nosed bat (Murina cyclotis) is a species of bat in the family Vespertilionidae from Central and Southeast Asia.
