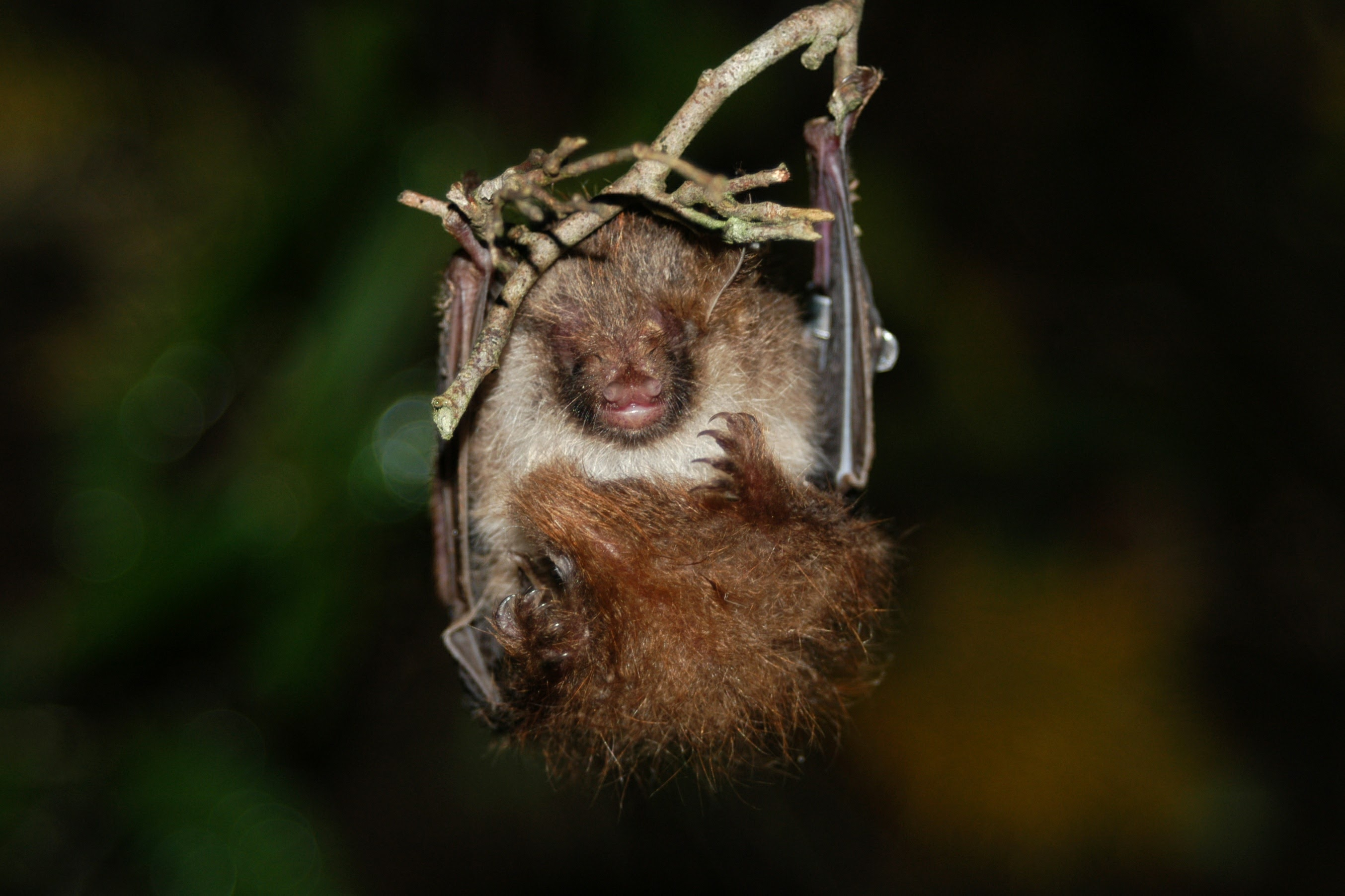

Conservation status
- Least Concern (IUCN 3.1)

Scientific classification
- Kingdom: Animalia
- Phylum: Chordata
- Class: Mammalia
- Infraclass: Placentalia
- Order: Chiroptera
- Family: Vespertilionidae
- Genus: Murina
- Species: M. ussuriensis

Binomial name
- Murina ussuriensis Ognev, 1913
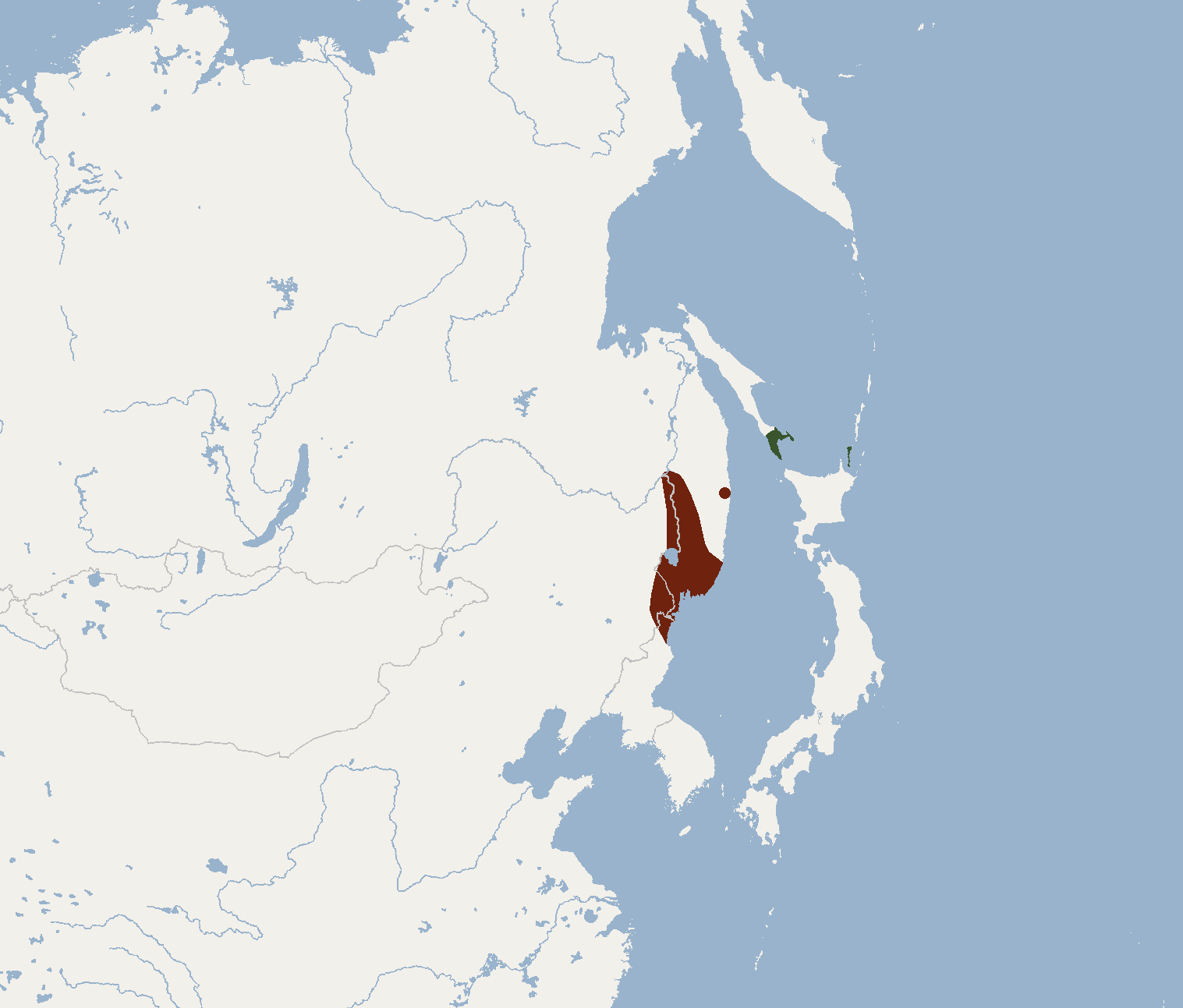

Synonyms
- Murina silvatica Yoshiyuki, 1983; Murina aurata ussuriensis Ognev, 1913

= Ussuri tube-nosed bat =

Species of bat

The Ussuri tube-nosed bat or Forest tube-nosed bat (Murina ussuriensis) is a species of vesper bat in the family Vespertilionidae. It is threatened by habitat loss. It is the only species of bat that hibernates in snowbanks.

== Taxonomy and etymology ==
It was described as a new species in 1913 by Russian zoologist Sergey Ognev. Its species name "ussuriensis" comes from Ussuriland. The holotype had been collected in Ussuriland by Nikolaus Ikonnikov (also spelled Ikonnikoff). In 1951, Ellerman and Morrison-Scott classified it as a subspecies of the little tube-nosed bat with a trinomen of Murina aurata ussuriensis. The population in Japan is sometimes referred to as Murina silvatica.

== Description ==
It is a moderately small member of its genus, with a forearm length of 27 mm (1.1 in). Its head and body length is 40 mm (1.6 in), while its tail is 25 mm (0.98 in). Its fur is soft and short. Fur on the back is tricolored, with reddish brown tips, pale middles, and dark roots. The belly fur is pale and grayish in comparison. The tops of its feet and legs are very hairy, as well as the back of its uropatagium. Individuals weigh 4–8 g (0.14–0.28 oz).

== Biology and ecology ==
=== Roosting behavior ===
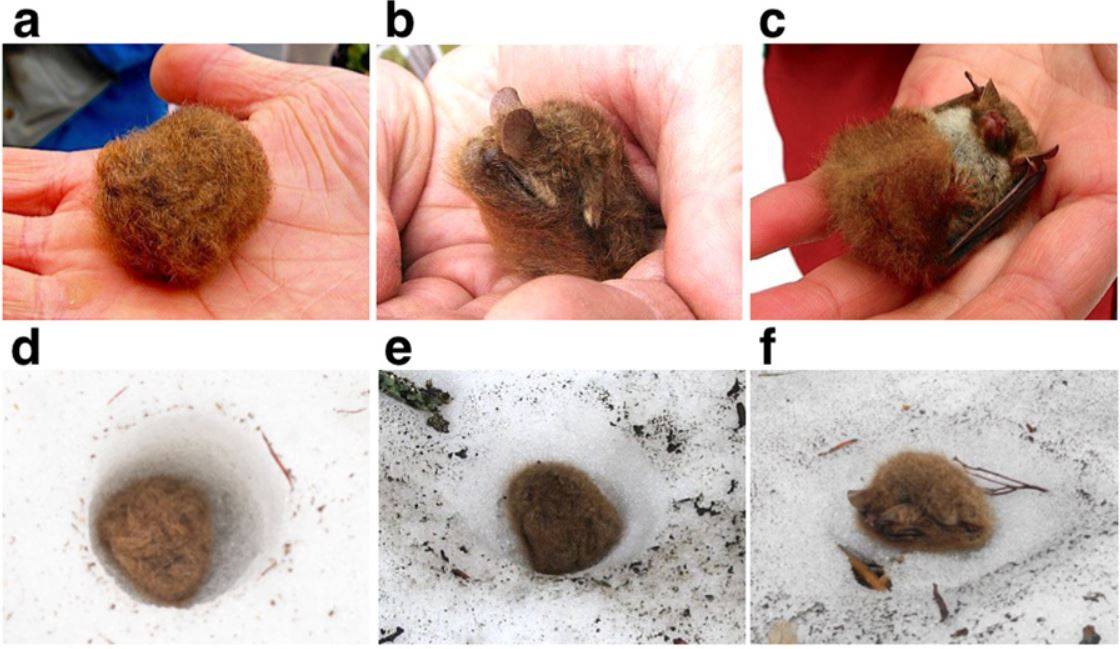
Ussuri tube-nosed bat hibernating within its snow hole

In the spring and autumn, it primarily roosts in clumps of dead leaves, but it also utilizes tree cavities and peeling tree bark. Trees used for roosting include Litsea acuminata (a laurel species), Neolitsea sericea, Camellia sasanqua, Ardisia sieboldii, Cinnamomum camphora, and Ficus superba. Females switch roosts frequently, moving to a new roost every day in one study. It is colonial, with females forming maternity colonies. These colonies last from June to August; the rest of the year, each sex is solitary. These colonies consist of 2–22 individuals. The frequent roost-switching and variable colony sizes exhibited in maternity colonies suggests a fission-fusion social structure. It is the only known bat that hibernates in snow. In the winter, it has been found roosting within cylindrical or conical holes in snowbanks. It is hypothesized that the bats excavate these cavities themselves. Hibernating within the snow may protect it from predators and prevent water loss; the snow holes likely have a stable thermal environment, as well. The only other mammal species known to hibernate within snow is the polar bear.

=== Reproduction and life history ===
Females are strongly philopatric, meaning that they likely stay in their natal ranges. Therefore, females in a given area are closely related, influencing the social structure of colonies. Females give birth in the summer to an offspring called a pup. Pups are weaned in the summer, and some reach sexual maturity in their first autumn. It is a relatively short-lived species for a bat, with maximum age recorded as 4 and 4.5 years for males and females, respectively.

=== Parasites and disease ===
The Ussuri tube-nosed bat is affected by endoparasites such as Vampirolepis yakushimaensis, a species of Hymenolepidid tapeworm. V. yakushimaensis was described as a new species based on 13 specimens recovered from the small intestine of one individual.

It was also one of the first bat species in Asia to test positive for Pseudogymnoascus destructans, the fungus that causes white-nose syndrome. One individual tested positive for the fungus during summer sampling of a cave in Northeast China. The disease does not appear as lethal in China as it is to bats in the United States, though.

== Distribution ==
It can be found in North Korea, South Korea, Japan (Hokkaido, Honshu, Shikoku, Kyushu, Tsushima Island, Yakushima Island and Iki Island) and Russia (Primorye, southernmost Sakhalin and the Kuril Islands). It has been reported In northeast China (Inner Mongolia, Jilin and Heilongjiang) but this has yet to be verified.
