= Slender tube-nosed bat =

Conservation status
- Least Concern (IUCN 3.1)

Scientific classification
- Kingdom: Animalia
- Phylum: Chordata
- Class: Mammalia
- Order: Chiroptera
- Family: Vespertilionidae
- Genus: Murina
- Species: M. gracilis

Binomial name
- Murina gracilis Kuo et al. 2009

Species of bat

The slender tube-nosed bat (Murina gracilis) is a species of vesper bat in the family Vespertilionidae found only in Taiwan.
