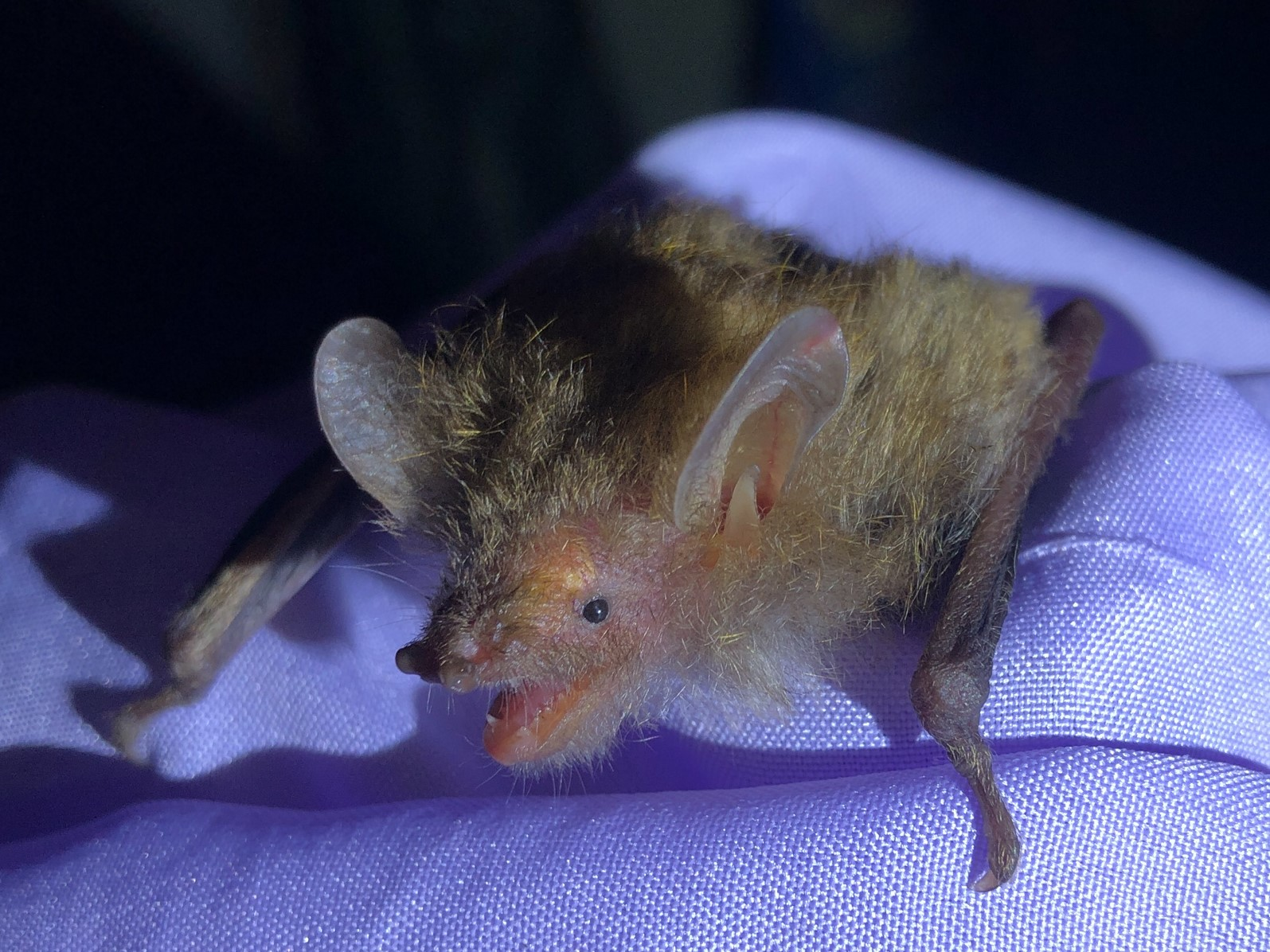

Conservation status
- Least Concern (IUCN 3.1)

Scientific classification
- Kingdom: Animalia
- Phylum: Chordata
- Class: Mammalia
- Order: Chiroptera
- Family: Vespertilionidae
- Genus: Murina
- Species: M. recondita

Binomial name
- Murina recondita Kuo, Fang, Csorba, & Lee, 2009

= Hidden tube-nosed bat =

Species of bat

The hidden tube-nosed bat (Murina recondita) is a species of bat found in Taiwan.

== Taxonomy ==
Murina recondita was described as a new species in 2009. The holotype had been collected in 2003 in Ruisui, Taiwan. Its species name "recondita" means "hidden" or "concealed", and was chosen in reference to the dull coloration of its fur.

== Description ==
It is a smaller member of its genus, with a forearm length of 28–31.5 mm (1.10–1.24 in).

== Range and habitat ==
Murina recondita is endemic to Taiwan, where it occurs in hilly and mountainous areas. It has been documented at a range of elevations from 40–2,200 m (130–7,220 ft) above sea level.
