= Da Lat tube-nosed bat =

Conservation status
- Endangered (IUCN 3.1)

Scientific classification
- Kingdom: Animalia
- Phylum: Chordata
- Class: Mammalia
- Order: Chiroptera
- Family: Vespertilionidae
- Genus: Murina
- Species: M. harpioloides

Binomial name
- Murina harpioloides Kruskop & Eger, 2008

Species of bat

The Da Lat tube-nosed bat (Murina harpioloides) is a species of vesper bats (Vespertilionidae). It is found in Vietnam, on the Da Lat plateau.
