= Little tube-nosed bat =

Conservation status
- Data Deficient (IUCN 3.1)

Scientific classification
- Kingdom: Animalia
- Phylum: Chordata
- Class: Mammalia
- Order: Chiroptera
- Family: Vespertilionidae
- Genus: Murina
- Species: M. aurata

Binomial name
- Murina aurata Milne-Edwards, 1872

Species of bat

The little tube-nosed bat (Murina aurata) is a species of bat. An adult little tube-nosed bat has a body length of 4.0-4.6 cm, a tail length of 2.8-3.6 cm, and a wing length of 3.0-3.3 cm. The species is found across South and East Asia, from the Indian subcontinent to the Korean Peninsula.
