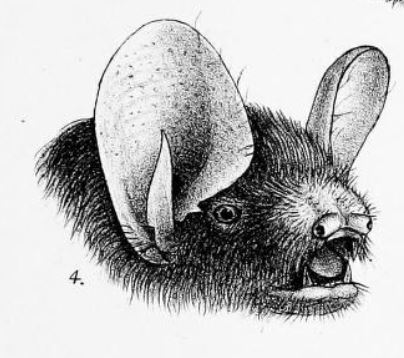

Conservation status
- Least Concern (IUCN 3.1)

Scientific classification
- Kingdom: Animalia
- Phylum: Chordata
- Class: Mammalia
- Order: Chiroptera
- Family: Vespertilionidae
- Genus: Murina
- Species: M. leucogaster

Binomial name
- Murina leucogaster (Milne-Edwards, 1872)

= Greater tube-nosed bat =

Species of bat

The greater tube-nosed bat (Murina leucogaster) is a species of bat. An adult greater tube-nosed bat has a body length of 4.2-5.7 cm, a tail length of 3.6-4.1 cm, and a wing length of 3.7-4.4 cm. The species is found in India, Mongolia, China, and Korea.

The greater tube-nosed bat's call has twelve simple syllables and five composites with harmonics in the ultrasonic range. When emitting aggression calls, they bare their teeth, pull up their wings, and attack other individuals by biting. Males have stereotypical mating behaviors of shaking their bodies and licking their genitalia.
