= List of bats of Madagascar =

Bats are one of the major components of the indigenous mammalian fauna of Madagascar, in addition to tenrecs, lemurs, euplerid carnivores, and nesomyine rodents. Forty-six bat species have so far been recorded on Madagascar, of which thirty-six occur only on the island. However, new species continue to be discovered, causing the number of species to rise rapidly; for example, Nick Garbutt's Mammals of Madagascar (2007) listed only 36 species. Most Malagasy bats have their origins in nearby mainland Africa, but on at least three occasions—Pipistrellus raceyi, Pteropus rufus, and the species pair Emballonura atrata–E. tiavato—bats have colonized Madagascar from Asia.

== Taxonomic classification ==
The following bat genera and families include species found on Madagascar (all species counts are for Madagascar only):

- Family Pteropodidae (3 endemic species)
  - Genus Eidolon (1 endemic species)
  - Genus Pteropus (1 endemic species)
  - Genus Rousettus (1 endemic species)
- Family Hipposideridae (6 endemic species)
  - Genus Hipposideros (1 extinct endemic species)
  - Genus Macronycteris (2 endemic species)
  - Genus Paratriaenops (2 endemic species)
  - Genus Triaenops (2 endemic species, one of which is extinct)
- Family Emballonuridae (2 endemic, 2 non-endemic species)
  - Genus Coleura (1 non-endemic species)
  - Genus Emballonura (2 endemic species)
  - Genus Taphozous (1 non-endemic species)
- Family Nycteridae (1 endemic species)
  - Genus Nycteris (1 endemic species)
- Family Myzopodidae (2 endemic species)
  - Genus Myzopoda (2 endemic species)
- Family Molossidae (5 endemic, 3 non-endemic species)
  - Genus Chaerephon (2 endemic, 1 non-endemic species)
  - Genus Mops (1 endemic, 1 non-endemic species)
  - Genus Mormopterus (1 endemic species)
  - Genus Otomops (1 endemic species)
  - Genus Tadarida (1 non-endemic species)
- Family Miniopteridae (9 endemic, 2 non-endemic species)
  - Genus Miniopterus (9 endemic, 2 non-endemic species)
- Family Vespertilionidae (8 endemic, 4 non-endemic species)
  - Genus Hypsugo (1 non-endemic species)
  - Genus Myotis (1 endemic species)
  - Genus Neoromicia (3 endemic species)
  - Genus Pipistrellus (1 endemic, 1 non-endemic species)
  - Genus Scotophilus (3 endemic, 1 non-endemic species)

== Key ==
Scientific name	Scientific name of the species
Classified	Year when the species was formally described and classified, as well as the binomial authority of the species
Distribution	Geographic distribution of the species. Abbreviations used are S, south; N, north; E, east; W, west; C, central; SW, southwest; etcetera.
Forearm	Range in forearm length of adult members of the species, in metric and English units
Conservation status	Conservation status of the species, per IUCN as of 2008, except as indicated. "Not evaluated" is used to indicate that no IUCN status assessment is available.

== Family Pteropodidae ==
Pteropodidae are a diverse family, with 186 species recognized in 2005, which occurs across the tropical regions of the Old World. They include the largest bats, but also some smaller species, and are mostly diurnal and frugivorous. Three species are known from Madagascar; each is classified in its own genus and is most closely related to species from outside Madagascar.

Scientific name	Classified	Distribution	Forearm	Conservation status	References
Eidolon dupreanum (Note: Sometimes included in the mainland African species Eidolon helvum.)	1866, Pollen	Madagascar only	115 to 130 mm (4.5 to 5.1 in)	Vulnerable	
Pteropus rufus	1803, E. Geoffroy	Madagascar only	155 to 175 mm (6.1 to 6.9 in)	Vulnerable	
Rousettus madagascariensis (Note: Sometimes included in the mainland African species Rousettus lanosus.)	1928, G. Grandidier	Madagascar only; absent in SW	65 to 75 mm (2.6 to 3.0 in)	Near threatened	

== Family Hipposideridae ==
Hipposideridae are a moderately diverse family—81 species were listed in 2005—and occur across the Old World tropics. Insectivorous, cave-roosting, and characterized by an elaborate noseleaf, they have often been united with the horseshoe bats (Rhinolophus; absent from Madagascar) into a single family Rhinolophidae, but are currently classified separately. Six species, all endemic, are known from Madagascar, of which four are extant. Macronycteris commersoni is the largest non-pteropodid bat of Madagascar and the extinct Hipposideros besaoka was even larger. The other species belong to the closely related genera Triaenops and Paratriaenops; the latter was split from Triaenops in 2009 and is restricted to Madagascar and the western Seychelles.

Scientific name	Classified	Distribution	Forearm	Conservation status	References
Hipposideros besaoka	2007, Samonds	Anjohibe, NW Madagascar only	–	Extinct (Note: Not in IUCN Red List.)	
Macronycteris commersoni (Note: Previously placed in the genus Hipposideros as H. commersoni and H. cryptovalorona.)	1813, E. Geoffroy	Madagascar only	83 to 97 mm (3.3 to 3.8 in)	Near threatened	
Macronycteris cryptovalorona	2016, Goodman et al.	Madagascar only	80 to 81 mm (3.1 to 3.2 in)	Not evaluated	
Paratriaenops auritus (Note: Previously placed in the genus Triaenops as Triaenops auritus and Triaenops furculus, but now classified in Paratriaenops.)	1912, G. Grandidier	N and NW Madagascar only	44 to 51 mm (1.7 to 2.0 in)	Vulnerable (Note: As Triaenops auritus.)	
Paratriaenops furcula	1906, Trouessart	W and SW Madagascar only	42 to 49 mm (1.7 to 1.9 in)	Least concern (Note: As Triaenops furculus.)	
Triaenops goodmani	2007, Samonds	Anjohibe, NW Madagascar only	–	Extinct	
Triaenops menamena (Note: Populations now included in this species have previously also been included in Triaenops persicus, which is now restricted to the Middle East, but are more conventionally known as Triaenops rufus. This name is, however, in fact a synonym of T. persicus; therefore, the new name menamena was introduced for the Madagascan populations in 2009.)	2009, Goodman and Ranivo	N, W, and S Madagascar only	46 to 56 mm (1.8 to 2.2 in)	Least concern (Note: As Triaenops rufus.)	

== Family Emballonuridae ==
With 51 species (2005), Emballonuridae are a moderately diverse family. Found in tropical and subtropical regions across the world, they are characterized by a tail that extends beyond the uropatagium (tail membrane), but may be retracted into a sheath. Four species are known from Madagascar, of which two are endemic and two others are shared with mainland Africa.

Scientific name	Classified	Distribution	Forearm	Conservation status	References
Coleura afra	1852, Peters	Ankarana, N Madagascar; Sub-Saharan Africa; Yemen	45 to 55 mm (1.8 to 2.2 in)	Least concern	
Emballonura atrata	1836, Eydoux and Gervais	E Madagascar only	c. 37 to 40 mm (1.5 to 1.6 in)	Least concern	
Emballonura tiavato	2006, Goodman et al.	N and W Madagascar only	35 to 41 mm (1.4 to 1.6 in)	Least concern	
Taphozous mauritianus	1818, E. Geoffroy	Madagascar and other W Indian Ocean islands; Sub-Saharan Africa	58 to 64 mm (2.3 to 2.5 in)	Least concern	

== Family Nycteridae ==
Nycteridae is a small family of 16 species (2005) in a single genus found in Africa and east to the Sunda Islands. They are characterized by a groove on their face and are insectivorous. A single, poorly known species has been recorded from Madagascar.

Scientific name	Classified	Distribution	Forearm	Conservation status	References
Nycteris madagascariensis (Note: Sometimes included in the mainland African species Nycteris macrotis.)	1937, G. Grandidier	N Madagascar only	50 to 52 mm (about 2.0 in)	Data deficient	

== Family Myzopodidae ==
This family, characterized by suction disks on the hand and feet, is unique to Madagascar. (It does, however, have a fossil record in Africa extending from the late Eocene to the Pleistocene.) A single species has historically been recognized, but eastern and western populations were classified as separate species in 2007.

Scientific name	Classified	Distribution	Forearm	Conservation status	References
Myzopoda aurita	1878, Milne-Edwards and Grandidier	E Madagascar only	46 to 49 mm (1.8 to 1.9 in)	Least concern	
Myzopoda schliemanni	2007, Goodman et al.	W Madagascar only	45 to 49 mm (1.8 to 1.9 in)	Least concern	

== Family Molossidae ==
This diverse family of 100 species (2005) occurs across the world in tropical regions. The tail conspicuously projects from the uropatagium and the wings are long. Eight species are known from Madagascar, four of which are endemic.

Scientific name	Classified	Distribution	Forearm	Conservation status	References
Chaerephon atsinanana (Note: Previously included in the mainland African Chaerephon pumilus (or Tadarida pumila).)	2010, Goodman et al.	E Madagascar	37 to 42 mm (1.5 to 1.7 in)		
Chaerephon jobimena	2004, Goodman and Cardiff	Madagascar only	45 to 48 mm (1.8 to 1.9 in)	Least concern	
Chaerephon leucogaster	1870, A. Grandidier	W Madagascar; Sub-Saharan Africa; Mayotte	33 to 38 mm (1.3 to 1.5 in)	Not evaluated (Note: Included in Tadarida pumila.)	
Mops leucostigma	1918, G.M. Allen	Madagascar only	42 to 45 mm (1.7 to 1.8 in)	Least concern (Note: As Tadarida leucostigma.)	
Mops midas	1843, Sundevall	Madagascar; Sub-Saharan Africa; Saudi Arabia	62 to 63 mm (2.4 to 2.5 in)	Least concern (Note: As Tadarida midas.)	
Mormopterus jugularis	1865, Peters	Madagascar only	37 to 40 mm (1.5 to 1.6 in)	Least concern	
Otomops madagascariensis (Note: Previously included in the mainland African Otomops martiensseni.)	1953, Dorst	Madagascar only	59 to 65 mm (2.3 to 2.6 in)	Least concern	
Tadarida fulminans	1903, Thomas	Madagascar; Sub-Saharan Africa north to Kenya	57 to 60 mm (2.2 to 2.4 in)	Least concern	

== Family Miniopteridae ==
This family contains a single genus, Miniopterus, with 19 species recognized in 2005, which was classified in Vespertilionidae until recently. Insectivorous and characterized by long fingers, the species are all quite similar, leading to a confused classification. On Madagascar, four species were recognized as recently as 2007, but systematic research has led the number to increase to eleven, of which nine are restricted to Madagascar and two shared with the Comoros.

Scientific name	Classified	Distribution	Forearm	Conservation status	References
Miniopterus aelleni	2009, Goodman et al.	N and W Madagascar; Anjouan, Comoros	35 to 41 mm (1.4 to 1.6 in)	Not evaluated	
Miniopterus brachytragos	2009, Goodman et al.	N and W Madagascar only	35 to 38 mm (1.4 to 1.5 in)	Not evaluated	
Miniopterus egeri	2011, Goodman et al.	E Madagascar only	37 to 40 mm (1.5 to 1.6 in)	Not evaluated	
Miniopterus gleni	1995, Peterson et al.	Madagascar only, except S	47 to 50 mm (1.9 to 2.0 in)	Least concern	
Miniopterus griffithsi	2009, Goodman et al.	S Madagascar only	48 to 50 mm (1.9 to 2.0 in)	Not evaluated	
Miniopterus griveaudi	1959, Harrison	N and W Madagascar; Comoros	35 to 38 mm (1.4 to 1.5 in)	Data deficient	
Miniopterus mahafaliensis	2009, Goodman et al.	S Madagascar only	35 to 40 mm (1.4 to 1.6 in)	Not evaluated	
Miniopterus majori	1906, Thomas	Madagascar only (Note: Although often cited for the Comoros, its occurrence there is questionable.)	43 to 47 mm (1.7 to 1.9 in)	Least concern	
Miniopterus manavi	1906, Thomas	Central Highlands, Madagascar only	38 to 39 mm (1.5 to 1.5 in)	Least concern	
Miniopterus petersoni	2008, Goodman et al.	SE Madagascar only	38 to 43 mm (1.5 to 1.7 in)	Data deficient	
Miniopterus sororculus	2007, Goodman et al.	Central Highlands, Madagascar only	42 to 45 mm (1.7 to 1.8 in)	Least concern	

== Family Vespertilionidae ==
With 407 species (2005; including Miniopterus, which is now classified in its own family), Vespertilionidae is the largest bat family. Characterized by a tail contained in the uropatagium, they occur around the world in many habitats and are insectivorous. Madagascar hosts an endemic species of the extremely widespread genus Myotis, four species (three endemic) of the house bat Scotophilus, and at least six (four endemic) of small vespertilionids ("pipistrelles") in the genera Hypsugo, Eptesicus, Neoromicia, and Pipistrellus. The classification of the "pipistrelles" is confused, leading to many changing identifications. In addition to the six "pipistrelles" listed here, the African Neoromicia nanus has also been recorded from Madagascar, but the identification of the Madagascar records needs to be confirmed.

Scientific name	Classified	Distribution	Forearm	Conservation status	References
Hypsugo anchietae (Note: Previously placed in the genus Pipistrellus as Pipistrellus anchietae.)	1900, Seabra	SW Madagascar; southern Africa	28 to 31 mm (1.1 to 1.2 in)	Least concern (Note: As Pipistrellus anchietae.)	
Myotis goudoti	1834, A. Smith	Madagascar only	32 to 41 mm (1.3 to 1.6 in)	Least concern	
Neoromicia malagasyensis (Note: Previously included in Eptesicus, as Eptesicus malagasyensis and/or considered a subspecies of Neoromicia somalicus (=Eptesicus somalicus) from mainland Africa.)	1995, Peterson et al.	Isalo, SC Madagascar only	30 to 32 mm (1.2 to 1.3 in)	Endangered (Note: As Eptesicus malagasyensis.)	
Neoromicia matroka (Note: Previously included in Eptesicus or Pipistrellus and/or considered a subspecies of Neoromicia capensis (=Eptesicus capensis; Pipistrellus capensis).)	1905, Thomas and Schwann	E Madagascar only	31 to 33 mm (1.2 to 1.3 in)	Least concern (Note: As Eptesicus matroka.)	
Neoromicia robertsi (Note: Specimens identified as this species were previously called Neoromicia melckorum, and they have also been included in the genus Eptesicus or Pipistrellus.)	2012, Goodman et al.	E Madagascar only	34 to 38 mm (1.3 to 1.5 in)	Not evaluated	
Pipistrellus hesperidus (Note: Previously included in the European species Pipistrellus kuhlii.)	1840, Temminck	W Madagascar; Sub-Saharan Africa	29 to 31 mm (1.1 to 1.2 in)	Least concern	
Pipistrellus raceyi	2006, Bates et al.	W and E Madagascar only	28 to 31 mm (1.1 to 1.2 in)	Least concern	
Scotophilus cf. borbonicus (Note: It is uncertain whether the single known specimen from Madagascar belongs to this species, otherwise known from Réunion by a single specimen.)	1803, E. Geoffroy	Sarodrano, SW Madagascar; Réunion	51 to 52 mm (about 2.0 in)	Data deficient	
Scotophilus marovaza	2006, Goodman et al.	W Madagascar only	41 to 45 mm (1.6 to 1.8 in)	Least concern	
Scotophilus robustus	1881, Milne-Edwards	Madagascar only	62 to 65 mm (2.4 to 2.6 in)	Least concern	
Scotophilus tandrefana	2005, Goodman et al.	W Madagascar only	44 to 47 mm (1.7 to 1.9 in)	Data deficient	

== See also ==
- List of mammals of Madagascar

== Literature cited ==
=== General ===
- Garbutt, N. 2007. Mammals of Madagascar: A Complete Guide. London: A & C Black, 304 pp. ISBN 978-0-7136-7043-1
- Goodman, S.M., Weyeneth, N., Ibrahim, Y., Saïd, I. and Ruedi, M. 2010b. A review of the bat fauna of the Comoro Archipelago (subscription required). Acta Chiropterologica 12(1):117–141.
- Nowak, R.M. 1994. Walker's Bats of the World. Baltimore: The Johns Hopkins University Press, 287 pp. ISBN 978-0-8018-4986-2
- Simmons, N.B. 2005. Order Chiroptera. Pp. 312–529 in Wilson, D.E. and Reeder, D.M. (eds.). Mammal Species of the World: a taxonomic and geographic reference. 3rd ed. Baltimore: The Johns Hopkins University Press, 2 vols., 2142 pp. ISBN 978-0-8018-8221-0
- Wilson, D.E. and Reeder, D.M. (eds.). 2005. Mammal Species of the World: a taxonomic and geographic reference. 3rd ed. Baltimore: The Johns Hopkins University Press, 2 vols., 2142 pp. ISBN 978-0-8018-8221-0

=== Pteropodidae ===
- Andriafidison, D., Cardiff, S.G., Goodman, S.M., Hutson, A.M., Jenkins, R.K.B., Kofoky, A.F., Racey, P.A., Ranivo, J., Ratrimomanarivo, F.H. and Razafimanahaka, H.J. 2008a. Eidolon dupreanum. IUCN Red List of Threatened Species. Version 2009.2. Downloaded May 26, 2010.
- Andriafidison, D, Cardiff, S.G., Goodman, S.M., Hutson, A.M., Jenkins, R.K.B., Kofoky, A.F., Rabearivelo, A., Racey, P.A., Ranivo, J., Ratrimomanarivo, F.H. and Razafimanahaka, H.J. 2008b. Pteropus rufus. IUCN Red List of Threatened Species. Version 2009.2. Downloaded May 26, 2010.
- Andriafidison, D., Cardiff, S.G., Goodman, S.M., Hutson, A.M., Jenkins, R.K.B., Kofoky, A.F., Racey, P.A., Ranivo, J., Ratrimomanarivo, F.H. and Razafimanahaka, H.J. 2008c. Rousettus madagascariensis. IUCN Red List of Threatened Species. Version 2009.2. Downloaded May 26, 2010.

=== Hipposideridae ===
- Andriafidison, D, Cardiff, S.G., Goodman, S.M., Hutson, A.M., Jenkins, R.K.B., Kofoky, A.F., Racey, P.A., Ranivo, J., Ratrimomanarivo, F.H. and Razafimanahaka, H.J. 2008f. Hipposideros commersoni. IUCN Red List of Threatened Species. Version 2009.2. Downloaded May 27, 2010.
- Andriafidison, D., Cardiff, S.G., Goodman, S.M., Hutson, A.M., Jenkins, R.K.B., Kofoky, A.F., Racey, P.A., Ranivo, J., Ratrimomanarivo, F.H. and Razafimanahaka, H.J. 2008o. Triaenops auritus. IUCN Red List of Threatened Species. Version 2009.2. Downloaded May 27, 2010.
- Andriafidison, D., Cardiff, S.G., Goodman, S.M., Hutson, A.M., Jenkins, R.K.B., Kofoky, A.F., Racey, P.A., Ranivo, J., Ratrimomanarivo, F.H. and Razafimanahaka, H.J. 2008p. Triaenops furculus. IUCN Red List of Threatened Species. Version 2009.2. Downloaded May 27, 2010.
- Andriafidison, D., Cardiff, S.G., Goodman, S.M., Hutson, A.M., Jenkins, R.K.B., Kofoky, A.F., Racey, P.A., Ranivo, J., Ratrimomanarivo, F.H. and Razafimanahaka, H.J. 2008q. Triaenops rufus. IUCN Red List of Threatened Species. Version 2009.2. Downloaded May 27, 2010.
- Benda, P. and Vallo, P. 2009. Taxonomic revision of the genus Triaenops (Chiroptera: Hipposideridae) with description of a new species from southern Arabia and definitions of a new genus and tribe. Folia Zoologica 58 (Monograph 1):1–45.
- Foley, N.M.; Goodman, S.M.; Whelan, C.V.; Puechmaille, S.J.; Teeling, E. (2017). "Towards navigating the Minotaur's labyrinth: cryptic diversity and taxonomic revision within the speciose genus Hipposideros (Hipposideridae) (subscription required)". Acta Chiropterologica. 19 (1): 1–18. doi:10.3161/15081109acc2017.19.1.001. S2CID 89997441.
- Goodman, S.M. and Ranivo, J. 2009. The geographical origin of the type specimens of Triaenops rufus and T. humbloti (Chiroptera: Hipposideridae) reputed to be from Madagascar and the description of a replacement species name (subscription required). Mammalia 73:47–55.
- Goodman, S.M.; Schoeman, M.C.; Rakotoarivelo, A.; Willows-Munro, S. (2016). "How many species of Hipposideros have occurred on Madagascar since the Late Pleistocene? (subscription required)". Zoological Journal of the Linnean Society. 177 (2): 428–449. doi:10.1111/zoj.12368.
- Ranivo, J. and Goodman S.M. 2006. Révision taxinomique des Triaenops malgaches (Mammalia, Chiroptera, Hipposideridae). Zoosystema 28(4):963–985.
- Samonds, K.E. 2007. Late Pleistocene bat fossils from Anjohibe Cave, northwestern Madagascar. Acta Chiropterologica 9(1):39–65.

=== Emballonuridae ===
- Goodman, S.M., Cardiff, S.G., Ranivo, J., Russell, A.L. and Yoder, A.D. 2006a. A new species of Emballonura (Chiroptera, Emballonuridae) from the dry regions of Madagascar. American Museum Novitates 3538:1–24.
- Goodman, S.M., Cardiff, S.G. and Ratrimomanarivo, F.H. 2008a. First record of Coleura (Chiroptera: Emballonuridae) on Madagascar and identification and diagnosis of members of the genus (subscription required). Systematics and Biodiversity 6(2):283–292.
- Hutson, A.M., Racey, P., Ravino, J., Mickleburgh, S., Bergmans, W. and Fahr, J. 2008c. Taphozous mauritianus. IUCN Red List of Threatened Species. Version 2009.2. Downloaded May 27, 2010.
- Jenkins, R.K.B., Rakotoarivelo, A.R., Ratrimomanarivo, F.H. and Cardiff, S.G. 2008a. Emballonura atrata. IUCN Red List of Threatened Species. Version 2009.2. Downloaded May 27, 2010.
- Jenkins, R.K.B., Rakotoarivelo, A.R., Ratrimomanarivo, F.H. and Cardiff, S.G. 2008b. Emballonura tiavato. IUCN Red List of Threatened Species. Version 2009.2. Downloaded May 27, 2010.
- Mickleburgh, S., Hutson, A.M., Racey, P.A., Cardiff, S. and Bergmans, W. 2008c. Coleura afra. IUCN Red List of Threatened Species. Version 2009.2. Downloaded May 27, 2010.

=== Nycteridae ===
- Hutson, T., Racey, P.A. and Ravino, J. 2008a. Nycteris madagascariensis. IUCN Red List of Threatened Species. Version 2009.2. Downloaded May 27, 2010.

=== Myzopodidae ===
- Goodman, S.M., Rakotondraparany, F. and Kofoky, A. 2007. The description of a new species of Myzopoda (Myzopodidae: Chiroptera) from western Madagascar (subscription required). Mammalian Biology 72(2):65–81.
- Jenkins, R.K.B., Rakotoarivelo, A.R., Ratrimomanarivo, F.H. and Cardiff, S.G. 2008c. Myzopoda aurita. IUCN Red List of Threatened Species. Version 2009.2. Downloaded May 27, 2010.
- Jenkins, R.K.B., Rakotoarivelo, A.R., Ratrimomanarivo, F.H. and Cardiff, S.G. 2008d. Myzopoda schliemanni. IUCN Red List of Threatened Species. Version 2009.2. Downloaded May 27, 2010.

=== Molossidae ===
- Andriafidison, D., Cardiff, S.G., Goodman, S.M., Hutson, A.M., Jenkins, R.K.B., Kofoky, A.F., Racey, P.A., Ranivo, J., Ratrimomanarivo, F.H. and Razafimanahaka, H.J. 2008i. Mormopterus jugularis. IUCN Red List of Threatened Species. Version 2009.2. Downloaded May 27, 2010.
- Andriafidison, D., Cardiff, S.G., Goodman, S.M., Hutson, A.M., Jenkins, R.K.B., Kofoky, A.F., Racey, P.A., Ranivo, J., Ratrimomanarivo, F.H. and Razafimanahaka, H.J. 2008j. Otomops madagascariensis. IUCN Red List of Threatened Species. Version 2009.2. Downloaded May 27, 2010.
- Andriafidison, D., Cardiff, S.G., Goodman, S.M., Hutson, A.M., Jenkins, R.K.B., Kofoky, A.F., Racey, P.A., Ranivo, J., Ratrimomanarivo, F.H. and Razafimanahaka, H.J. 2008n. Tadarida leucostigma. IUCN Red List of Threatened Species. Version 2009.2. Downloaded May 27, 2010.
- Andriafidison, D., Cardiff, S.G., Goodman, S.M., Hutson, A.M., Jenkins, R.K.B., Kofoky, A.F., Racey, P.A., Ranivo, J., Ratrimomanarivo, F.H. and Razafimanahaka, H.J. 2014. Chaerephon jobimena. IUCN Red List of Threatened Species. Version 2014.3. Downloaded May 28, 2015.
- Cotterill, F.P.D, Hutson, A.M., Racey, P.A. and Ravino, J. 2008. Tadarida fulminans. IUCN Red List of Threatened Species. Version 2009.2. Downloaded May 27, 2010.
- Goodman, S.M. and Cardiff, S.G. 2004. A new species of Chaerephon (Molossidae) from Madagascar with notes on other members of the family. Acta Chiropterologica 6(2):227–248.
- Goodman, S.M., Buccas, W., Naidoo, T., Ratrimomanarivo, F., Taylor, P.J. and Lamb, J. 2010c. Patterns of morphological and genetic variation in western Indian Ocean members of the Chaerephon 'pumilus' complex (Chiroptera: Molossidae), with the description of a new species from Madagascar (subscription required). Zootaxa 2551:1–36.
- Jenkins, R.K.B., Racey, P.A., Ranivo, J., Ratimomanarivo, F., Mickleburgh, S., Hutson, A.M., Bergmans, W., Cotterill, F.P.D. and Fahr, J. 2008e. Tadarida midas. IUCN Red List of Threatened Species. Version 2009.2. Downloaded May 27, 2010.
- Mickleburgh, S., Hutson, A.M., Racey, P.A., Ravino, J., Bergmans, W., Cotterill, F.P.D. and Gerlach, J. 2008b. Tadarida pumila. IUCN Red List of Threatened Species. Version 2009.2. Downloaded May 27, 2010.
- Ratrimomanarivo, F.H., Goodman, S.M., Stanley, W.T., Naidoo, T., Taylor, P.J. and Lamb, J. 2009. Geographic and phylogeographic variation in Chaerephon leucogaster (Chiroptera: Molossidae) of Madagascar and the western Indian Ocean islands of Mayotte and Pemba (subscription required). Acta Chiropterologica 11(1):25–52.

=== Miniopteridae ===
- Andriafidison, D., Cardiff, S.G., Goodman, S.M., Hutson, A.M., Jenkins, R.K.B., Kofoky, A.F., Racey, P.A., Ranivo, J., Ratrimomanarivo, F.H. and Razafimanahaka, H.J. 2008g. Miniopterus gleni. IUCN Red List of Threatened Species. Version 2009.2. Downloaded May 27, 2010.
- Andriafidison, D., Cardiff, S.G., Goodman, S.M., Hutson, A.M., Jenkins, R.K.B., Kofoky, A.F., Racey, P.A., Ranivo, J., Ratrimomanarivo, F.H. and Razafimanahaka, H.J. 2008h. Miniopterus manavi. IUCN Red List of Threatened Species. Version 2009.2. Downloaded May 27, 2010.
- Goodman, S.M., Bradman, H.M., Maminirina, C.P., Ryan, K.E., Christidis, L. and Appleton, B. 2008b. A new species of Miniopterus (Chiroptera: Miniopteridae) from lowland southeastern Madagascar. Mammalian Biology 73:199–213.
- Goodman, S.M., Maminirina, C.P., Bradman, H.M., Christidis, L. and Appleton, B. 2009. The use of molecular phylogenetic and morphological tools to identify cryptic and paraphyletic species: Examples from the diminutive long-fingered bats (Chiroptera: Miniopteridae: Miniopterus) on Madagascar. American Museum Novitates 3669:1–34.
- Goodman, S.M., Maminirina, C.P., Bradman, H.M., Christidis, L. and Appleton, B.R. 2010a. Patterns of morphological and genetic variation in the endemic Malagasy bat Miniopterus gleni (Chiroptera: Miniopteridae), with the description of a new species, M. griffithsi (subscription required). Journal of Zoological Systematics and Evolutionary Research 48(1):75–86.
- Goodman, S.M., Ramasindrazana, B., Maminirina, C.P., Schoeman, M.C. and Appleton, B. 2011. Morphological, bioacoustical, and genetic variation in Miniopterus bats from eastern Madagascar, with the description of a new species. Zootaxa 2880:1–19.
- Jenkins, R.K.B. and Rakotoarivelo, A.R. 2008a. Miniopterus majori. IUCN Red List of Threatened Species. Version 2009.2. Downloaded May 27, 2010.
- Jenkins, R.K.B. and Rakotoarivelo, A.R. 2008b. Miniopterus petersoni. IUCN Red List of Threatened Species. Version 2009.2. Downloaded May 27, 2010.
- Jenkins, R.K.B., Rakotoarivelo, A.R., Ratrimomanarivo, F.H. and Cardiff, S.G. 2008f. Miniopterus sororculus. IUCN Red List of Threatened Species. Version 2009.2. Downloaded May 27, 2010.

=== Vespertilionidae ===
- Andriafidison, D., Cardiff, S.G., Goodman, S.M., Hutson, A.M., Jenkins, R.K.B., Kofoky, A.F., Racey, P.A., Ranivo, J., Ratrimomanarivo, F.H. and Razafimanahaka, H.J. 2008d. Eptesicus malagasyensis. IUCN Red List of Threatened Species. Version 2009.2. Downloaded May 27, 2010.
- Andriafidison, D., Cardiff, S.G., Goodman, S.M., Hutson, A.M.M., Jenkins, R.K.B., Kofoky, A.F., Racey, P.A., Ranivo, J., Ratrimomanarivo, F.H. and Razafimanahaka, H.J. 2008e. Eptesicus matroka. IUCN Red List of Threatened Species. Version 2009.2. Downloaded May 27, 2010.
- Andriafidison, D., Cardiff, S.G., Goodman, S.M., Hutson, A.M., Jenkins, R.K.B., Kofoky, A.F., Racey, P.A., Ranivo, J., Ratrimomanarivo, F.H. and Razafimanahaka, H.J. 2008i. Myotis goudoti. IUCN Red List of Threatened Species. Version 2009.2. Downloaded May 27, 2010.
- Andriafidison, D, Cardiff, S.G., Goodman, S.M., Hutson, A.M., Jenkins, R.K.B., Kofoky, A.F., Racey, P.A., Ranivo, J., Ratrimomanarivo, F.H. and Razafimanahaka, H.J. 2008k. Scotophilus borbonicus. IUCN Red List of Threatened Species. Version 2009.2. Downloaded May 27, 2010.
- Andriafidison, D., Cardiff, S.G., Goodman, S.M., Hutson, A.M., Jenkins, R.K.B., Kofoky, A.F., Racey, P.A., Ranivo, J., Ratrimomanarivo, F.H. and Razafimanahaka, H.J. 2008l. Scotophilus robustus. IUCN Red List of Threatened Species. Version 2009.2. Downloaded May 27, 2010.
- Bates, P.J.J., Ratrimomanarivo, F.H., Harrison, D.L. and Goodman, S.M. 2006. A description of a new species of Pipistrellus (Chiroptera: Vespertilionidae) from Madagascar with a review of related Vespertilioninae from the island. Acta Chiropterologica 8(2):299–324.
- Goodman S.M., Jenkins R.K.B. and Ratrimomanarivo F.H. 2005. A review of the genus Scotophilus (Mammalia, Chiroptera, Vespertilionidae) on Madagascar, with the description of a new species. Zoosystema 27(4):867–882.
- Goodman, S.M., Ratrimomanarivo, F.H. and Randrianandrianina, F.H. 2006b. A new species of Scotophilus (Chiroptera: Vespertilionidae) from western Madagascar. Acta Chiropterologica 8(1):21–37.
- Goodman, S.M., Taylor, P.J., Ratrimomanarivo, F. and Hoofer, S.R. 2012. The genus Neoromicia (family Vespertilionidae) in Madagascar, with the description of a new species (subscription required). Zootaxa 3250:1–25.
- Hutson, A.M., Racey, P.A., Goodman, S. and Jacobs, D. 2008b. Pipistrellus nanus. IUCN Red List of Threatened Species. Version 2009.2. Downloaded May 27, 2010.
- Jacobs, D., Cotterill, F.P.D., Taylor, P.J., Monadjem, A. and Griffin, M. 2008. Pipistrellus anchietae. IUCN Red List of Threatened Species. Version 2009.2. Downloaded May 27, 2010.
- Jenkins, R.K.B., Rakotoarivelo, A.R., Ratrimomanarivo, F.H. and Cardiff, S.G. 2008g. Pipistrellus raceyi. IUCN Red List of Threatened Species. Version 2009.2. Downloaded May 27, 2010.
- Jenkins, R.K.B., Rakotoarivelo, A.R., Ratrimomanarivo, F.H. and Cardiff, S.G. 2008h. Scotophilus marovaza. IUCN Red List of Threatened Species. Version 2009.2. Downloaded May 27, 2010.
- Jenkins, R.K.B., Rakotoarivelo, A.R., Ratrimomanarivo, F.H. and Cardiff, S.G. 2008i. Scotophilus tandrefana. IUCN Red List of Threatened Species. Version 2009.2. Downloaded May 27, 2010.
- Mickleburgh, S., Hutson, A.M. and Racey, P.A. 2008a. Pipistrellus hesperidus. IUCN Red List of Threatened Species. Version 2009.2. Downloaded May 27, 2010.
