= Triaenops goodmani =

Triaenops goodmani Temporal range: Early Holocene
- A mandible.

Conservation status
- Extinct

Scientific classification
- Domain: Eukaryota
- Kingdom: Animalia
- Phylum: Chordata
- Class: Mammalia
- Order: Chiroptera
- Family: Rhinonycteridae
- Genus: Triaenops
- Species: †T. goodmani

Binomial name
- †Triaenops goodmani Samonds, 2007
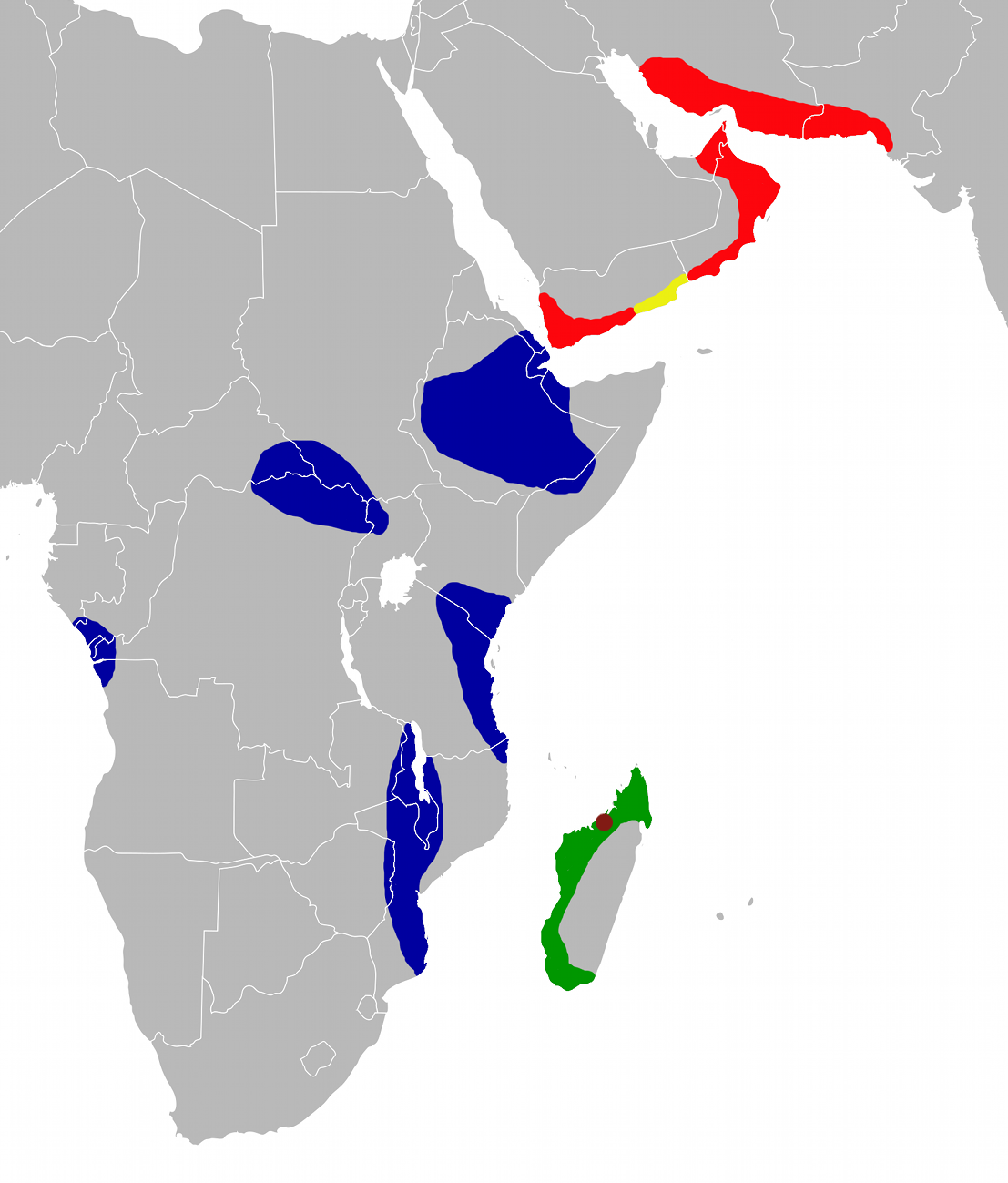
- Collection locality of Triaenops goodmani (in brown) and distribution of living species of Triaenops (green—T. menamena; blue—T. afer; red—T. persicus; yellow—T. persicus and T. parvus.

Species of mammal

Triaenops goodmani is an extinct bat from Madagascar in the genus Triaenops. It is known from three lower jaws collected in a cave at Anjohibe in 1996, and described as a new species in 2007. The material is at most 10,000 years old. A bat humerus (upper arm bone) from the same site could not be identified as either T. goodmani or the living T. menamena. T. goodmani is identifiable as a member of Triaenops or the related genus Paratriaenops by a number of features of the teeth, such as the single-cusped, canine-like fourth premolar and the presence of a gap between the entoconid and hypoconulid cusps on the first two molars. T. goodmani is larger than the living species of Triaenops and Paratriaenops on Madagascar, and on the first molar the protoconid cusp is only slightly higher than the hypoconid, not much higher as in the other species.

== Taxonomy and distribution ==
In 1996, a team led by David Burney collected breccias containing remains of bats and other animals from the cave of Anjohibe in northwestern Madagascar. The bats in the sample were described by Karen Samonds (previously Irwin) in her 2006 Ph.D. dissertation and a 2007 paper. She found several living species in addition to two extinct ones that she described as new, Triaenops goodmani and Hipposideros besaoka. At the time, the genus Triaenops was thought to include three species on Madagascar–Triaenops auritus, Triaenops furculus, and Triaenops rufus. Since then, Steven Goodman and Julie Ranivo have discovered that the name rufus is not in fact applicable to the Madagascar species and proposed the name Triaenops menamena for the Madagascan bats previously known as Triaenops rufus.

In addition, Petr Benda and Peter Vallo have removed the other two Madagascan species to a separate genus Paratriaenops, so that they are now known as Paratriaenops auritus and Paratriaenops furcula. The specific name of the extinct species, goodmani, honors Steven Goodman for his research on Madagascan bats. The material of T. goodmani is from locality OLD SE within the cave and is about 10,000 years old or younger. A cladistic analysis using morphological data could not resolve the relationships of Triaenops goodmani, but did not place it with the other species of Triaenops and Paratriaenops studied. In a 2008 paper, Amy Russell and colleagues commented that cranial (skull) characteristics of T. goodmani suggest it is a member of the "T. furcula/T. auritus group", now placed in Paratriaenops.

== Description ==
Triaenops goodmani is known from three mandibles (lower jaws): one with the fourth premolar (p4) and first and second molars (m1–2) and two with the second and third molars (m2–3). The jaw is relatively robust. The p4 resembles a canine, having a single cusp that is about as high as the highest cusp on m1 and lacking accessory shelves or cusps. The molars are narrow-crowned and longer than in T. menamena, P. auritus, and P. furcula. Length of m2 ranges from 1.55 to 1.57 mm and width from 0.98 to 1.02 mm. On m1, the trigonid (front group of cusps) is narrower and slightly higher than the talonid at the back. The protoconid, one of the main cusps in the trigonid, is the highest cusp, but is only slightly higher than the hypoconid (a cusp in the talonid); in living Madagascan Triaenops and Paratriaenops, the protoconid is substantially higher than the hypoconid. The paraconid, metaconid (both cusps in the trigonid), and entoconid (a cusp in the talonid) are lower than in Paratriaenops auritus. The hypoconulid (part of the talonid) is small but distinct and is the lowest cusp. It is separated from the entoconid by a gap. T. goodmani lacks a ridge, the preentocristid, connecting the entoconid to the metaconid. There is a crest (cingulum) at the front and back of the tooth. The last two molars are similar to m1, but in m2 the talonid is only slightly wider than the trigonid and in m3 the two are of equal width. In addition, a shelf is present between the protoconid and hypoconid on m2 and m3 is smaller, lacks the gap between the entoconid and hypoconulid, and has a weak ridge between the entoconid and metaconid. These characteristics are typical of Triaenops and Paratriaenops.

From the same site where T. goodmani was found, Samonds also recorded the distal (far) end of a Triaenops humerus (upper arm bone), with a width of 3.58 mm. This bone was similar to humeri of T. menamena, but she did not identify it as either species because of the small size difference between T. menamena and T. goodmani. In site NCC-1 (estimated 69,600 to 86,800 years old), two Triaenops mandibles were recorded, one with p4 and m1 and another with m1–2 and part of m3. Relative to living Triaenops and Paratriaenops, m1 in those jaws is longer and narrower. Although sample sizes are small, the measurements do not resemble those of T. goodmani. In addition, the ridge between the entoconid and metaconid is stronger than in T. goodmani. Samonds identified these jaws only as Triaenops.

== Literature cited ==
- Benda, P. and Vallo, P. 2009. Taxonomic revision of the genus Triaenops (Chiroptera: Hipposideridae) with description of a new species from southern Arabia and definitions of a new genus and tribe. Folia Zoologica 58(Monograph 1):1–45.
- Goodman, S.M. and Ranivo, J. 2009. The geographical origin of the type specimens of Triaenops rufus and T. humbloti (Chiroptera: Hipposideridae) reputed to be from Madagascar and the description of a replacement species name (subscription required). Mammalia 73:47–55.
- Russell, A.L., Goodman, S.M. and Cox, M.P. 2008. Coalescent analyses support multiple mainland-to-island dispersals in the evolution of Malagasy Triaenops bats (Chiroptera: Hipposideridae). Journal of Biogeography 35:995–1003.
- Samonds (Irwin), K.E. 2006. The origin and evolution of Malagasy bats: Implications of new Late Pleistocene fossils and cladistic analyses for reconstructing biogeographic history. Ph.D. Dissertation, Department of Anatomical Sciences, Stony Brook University, xx + 403 pp.
- Samonds, K.E. 2007. Late Pleistocene bat fossils from Anjohibe Cave, northwestern Madagascar. Acta Chiropterologica 9(1):39–65.
