= Isalo serotine =

Conservation status
- Vulnerable (IUCN 3.1)

Scientific classification
- Kingdom: Animalia
- Phylum: Chordata
- Class: Mammalia
- Order: Chiroptera
- Family: Vespertilionidae
- Genus: Laephotis
- Species: L. malagasyensis

Binomial name
- Laephotis malagasyensis (Peterson, Eger, and Mitchell, 1995)
- Collection localities of Laephotis malagasyensis

Synonyms
- Eptesicus somalicus malagasyensis Peterson et al., 1995; Neoromicia malagasyensis: Goodman and Ranivo, 2004; Eptesicus malagasyensis: Andriafidison et al., 2008

Species of bat in the genus Neoromicia

The Isalo serotine (Laephotis malagasyensis) is a vesper bat of Madagascar in the genus Laephotis. It is known only from the vicinity of the Isalo National Park in the southwestern part of the island, where it has been caught in riverine habitats. After the first specimen was caught in 1967, it was described as a subspecies of Eptesicus somalicus (now Neoromicia somalica) in 1995. After four more specimens were collected in 2002 and 2003, it was recognized as a separate species. Because of its small distribution and the threat of habitat destruction, it is considered "vulnerable" in the IUCN Red List.

Laephotis malagasyensis is a relatively small species, with a forearm length of 30 to 32 mm (1.2 to 1.3 in) and a body mass of 3.9 to 9 g (0.1 to 0.3 oz). The fur is dark brown above and mixed buff and gray below. The ears are translucent and the tibia is short. The baculum (penis bone) resembles that of N. melckorum, but is smaller. The duration of the echolocation call, which consists of a component with rapidly falling frequency and one showing more stable frequency, averages 4.9 ms and the interval between calls averages 69.1 ms.

== Taxonomy ==
In their 1995 review of Malagasy bats, Randolph Peterson and colleagues established Eptesicus somalicus malagasyensis, a new subspecies of Eptesicus somalicus (currently Neoromicia somalica). (Note: Neoromicia somalicus in Simmons (2005, p. 495). However, Ricucci and Lanza (2008) indicated that the gender of the name Neoromicia is feminine, and therefore the correct form is somalica) They had only a single specimen and noted that further material was needed to assess the new form's relationship with E. somalicus. Studies in 2001 and 2002 provided evidence that E. somalicus and related species are not closely related to Eptesicus (nor to Pipistrellus, where they have also been placed), so that these species were allocated to the separate genus Neoromicia. In 2004, Steven Goodman and Julie Ranivo reviewed the Malagasy subspecies after collecting two more specimens and concluded that it was distinct enough to be classified as a separate species, Neoromicia malagasyensis. Two years later, Paul Bates and colleagues reported on two more specimens and showed that the bacula (penis bones) of N. malagasyensis and N. somalica are different, providing further evidence that they are distinct species. However, they recommended that further research assess the degree of difference between N. malagasyensis and N. matroka (formerly in Eptesicus, but placed in Neoromicia by Bates and colleagues, and later placed in Laephotis), which occurs further east in Madagascar. The IUCN Red List currently again classifies the species in Eptesicus, as Eptesicus malagasyensis. In 2020, a phylogenetic analysis found it to belong to Laephotis as opposed to Neoromicia, and classified it as such.

Laephotis malagasyensis is one of at least six species of small vespertilionid bats ("pipistrelles") on Madagascar, in addition to L. matroka, L. robertsi, Pipistrellus hesperidus, P. raceyi, and Nycticeinops anchietae. The classification of these bats has historically been controversial, leading to many changing identifications and generic assignments. The genus Laephotis is exclusively African and included 4 species in the 2005 third edition of Mammal Species of the World; more species, like L. malagasyensis and L. matroka, have been added since. Common names proposed for this species include "Isalo Serotine" and "Peterson's 'pipistrelle'".

== Description ==
Measurements
Specimen	Sex	Forearm	Tail	Hindfoot	Ear	Mass
ROM 42713 (Note: Holotype)	Female	32	27	6 (Note: Including the claw.)	12	9
FMNH 175988	Male	30	37	4 (Note: Excluding the claw.)	11	3.9
FMNH 175989	Female	32	35	5	12	6.0
UA, uncatalogued	Male	30.1	30.4	5.3	9.8	–
UA, uncatalogued	Female	32.0	29.3	6.9	11.4	–
All measurements are in millimeters, except mass in grams.

Laephotis malagasyensis is a relatively small "pipistrelle", but larger than Neoromicia somalica. The fur on the back is long and dark brown and the underparts contain both gray and dark buff hairs; there, the fur becomes lighter towards the tail. The fur is darker than in N. somalica, but paler than in L. matroka The brown ears are translucent. The tragus (a projection on the inner side of the outer ear) is similar to that of N. somalica, but may be a little narrower. Relative to the two other Malagasy Laephotis species, the tibia is short. A single baculum (penis bone), 2.2 mm long, has been studied. It resembles the baculum of L. robertsi, but is smaller. As in L. matroka, the distal (far) end is flat and displaced downwards, but the L. malagasyensis baculum has a smaller area and less well-developed flanges at the sides and a smaller vertical extension of the bone.

The skull is somewhat smaller than that of L. matroka and the braincase and palate are narrower. Compared to N. somalica, the skull is broader. The ridge on the lacrimal bone is better developed, the palate is broader, the frontal bones contain a depression and are swollen at the sides, the mastoid bones are smaller, and the coronoid and angular processes of the mandible (lower jaw) are more prominent.

The echolocation call of this species was reported in a 2007 study that consists of a component with rapidly falling frequency followed by one with more slowly changing frequency. The call takes 3.6 to 6.3 ms, averaging 4.9 ms, and the period between two calls is 34.2 to 94.4 ms, averaging 69.1 ms. The maximum frequency averages 79.8 kHz, the minimum frequency averages 40.5 kHz, and the call emits the most energy at a frequency of 45.7 kHz.

== Distribution and ecology ==
Laephotis malagasyensis is known only from the vicinity of Isalo National Park, an area of about 2,000 km^{2} (772 sq mi), in interior southwestern Madagascar. The holotype was caught in 1967 in a mistnet set in a row of palms along a river in dry savannah habitat. Peterson and colleagues reported that it had been collected near the village of Marinday, but Goodman and Ranivo suggested that it may instead have come from near Ilakaka. Two specimens, a male and a female, were collected at different localities in Isalo National Park in early December 2002, both in mistnets near rivers. The male had enlarged testes and the female had recently stopped lactating and had large mammae. Two others followed in 2003, also from the national park, and caught in woodland near rivers. A 2009 study on echolocation described the call of six individuals of L. malagasyensis from an unspecified site within the national park. In view of its small known range and the threat of habitat destruction, the IUCN Red List assesses the species as "vulnerable"; further research is recommended on its roosting and dietary habits.

== Literature cited ==
- Bates, P.J.J.; Ratrimomanarivo, F.H.; Harrison, D.L.; and Goodman, S.M. (2006). "A description of a new species of Pipistrellus (Chiroptera: Vespertilionidae) from Madagascar with a review of related Vespertilioninae from the island". Acta Chiropterologica. 8 (2): 299–324. doi:10.3161/1733-5329(2006)8[299:ADOANS]2.0.CO;2.
- Goodman, S.M. and Ranivo, J. (2004). "The taxonomic status of Neoromicia somalicus malagasyensis". Mammalian Biology. 69 (6): 434–438. Bibcode:2004MamBi..69..434G. doi:10.1078/1616-5047-00166.
- Kofoky, A.F.; Randrianandrianina, F.; Russ, J.; Raharinantenaina, I.; Cardiff, S.G.; Jenkins, R.K.B.; and Racey, P.A. (2009). "Forest bats of Madagascar: results of acoustic surveys". Acta Chiropterologica. 11 (2): 375–392. doi:10.3161/150811009X485602.
- Peterson, R.L.; Eger, J.L.; and Mitchell, L. (1995). "Chiroptères". Faune de Madagascar (in French). 84: 1–204.
- Ricucci, M. and Lanza, B. (2008). "Neoromicia Roberts, 1926 (Mammalia Vespertilionidae): correction of gender and etymology". Hystrix Italian Journal of Mammalogy. 19 (2): 175–177. Archived from the original on 2016-03-04.
- Simmons, N.B. (2005). "Order Chiroptera". In Wilson, D.E.; Reeder, D.M (eds.). Mammal Species of the World: A Taxonomic and Geographic Reference (3rd ed.). Johns Hopkins University Press. pp. 312–529. ISBN 978-0-8018-8221-0. OCLC 62265494.
