= Angolan long-eared bat =

Conservation status
- Data Deficient (IUCN 3.1)

Scientific classification
- Kingdom: Animalia
- Phylum: Chordata
- Class: Mammalia
- Order: Chiroptera
- Family: Vespertilionidae
- Genus: Laephotis
- Species: L. angolensis

Binomial name
- Laephotis angolensis Monard, 1935

Species of bat

The Angolan long-eared bat (Laephotis angolensis) is a species of vesper bat in the Vespertilionidae family. It can be found in moist savanna in Angola and Democratic Republic of the Congo.

== Taxonomy and etymology ==
It was described as a new species in 1935 by Albert Monard. In papers published in 1953 and 1971, the Angolan long-eared bat was treated as a subspecies of De Winton's long-eared bat. However, it is generally treated as a full species at present. It has been suggested that it may be synonymous with Botswanan long-eared bat. Its species name "angolensis" is Latin for "Angolan," likely in reference to the fact that the holotype was encountered near Dala, Angola.

== Description ==
Its dental formula is 2.1.1.33.1.2.3 for a total of 32 teeth. The fur of its back is yellowish- or reddish-brown. Ventral fur is pale gray or cream in color.

== Range and habitat ==
It has only been documented in the Central Zambezian miombo woodlands. Its range includes Angola and the Democratic Republic of the Congo.

== Conservation ==
It is considered a locally rare species. As of 2008, it is assessed as a data deficient species by the IUCN.
