= Triaenops rufus =

Triaenops rufus can refer to:

- Triaenops menamena, the bat species from Madagascar to which the name was long, but incorrectly, applied
- Triaenops persicus, the Middle Eastern species of which it is in fact a synonym
