= Paratriaenops pauliani =

Conservation status
- Data Deficient (IUCN 3.1)

Scientific classification
- Kingdom: Animalia
- Phylum: Chordata
- Class: Mammalia
- Order: Chiroptera
- Family: Rhinonycteridae
- Genus: Paratriaenops
- Species: P. pauliani

Binomial name
- Paratriaenops pauliani (Goodman and Ranivo, 2008)
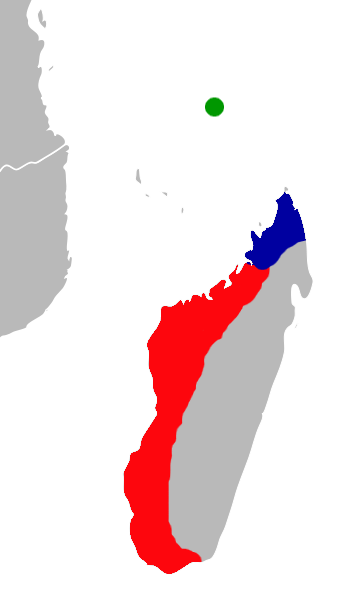
- Distribution of P. pauliani (green), P. auritus (blue) and P. furcula (red)

Synonyms
- Triaenops pauliani Goodman and Ranivo, 2008

Species of bat from Aldabra Atoll

Paratriaenops pauliani is a species of bat in the family Hipposideridae. It is endemic to Aldabra Atoll of the western Seychelles, where it was found on Picard Island. It was formerly considered to be part of the species Triaenops furculus, known from Madagascar, and was initially assigned as a new species within the genus Triaenops. Later it as well as T. furculus were placed in the separate genus Paratriaenops. A related species, Paratriaenops auritus, also of Madagascar, was similarly reassigned.

While its conservation status has not been formally assessed, given its small range and presumed small population, it is thought to be precarious, possibly critically endangered. Reports of P. pauliani from Cosmoledo Atoll east of Aldabra are believed to be erroneous descriptions of individuals actually collected on Picard Island.

== See also ==
- List of bats of Madagascar
