= Western sheath-tailed bat =

Conservation status
- Least Concern (IUCN 3.1)

Scientific classification
- Kingdom: Animalia
- Phylum: Chordata
- Class: Mammalia
- Order: Chiroptera
- Family: Emballonuridae
- Genus: Paremballonura
- Species: P. tiavato

Binomial name
- Paremballonura tiavato (Goodman, Cardiff, Ranivo, Russell & Yoder, 2006)

Synonyms
- Emballonura tiavato Goodman, Cardiff, Ranivo, Russell & Yoder, 2006

Species of bat

The western sheath-tailed bat (Paremballonura tiavato) is a species of sac-winged bat (family Emballonuridae) found in Madagascar.

== Taxonomy ==
The western sheath-tailed bat was described as a new species in 2006. The holotype had been collected in January 2001 in Ankarana Reserve. It was placed in the genus Emballonura with a scientific name of Emballonura tiavato. In 2012, a new genus of bat was described, Paremballonura. Both the western sheath-tailed bat and Peters's sheath-tailed bat were transferred to this new genus, making its scientific name Paremballonura tiavato. The species name "tiavato" is Malagasy for "likes rocks". The authors chose this name due to the likelihood of documenting this species in an area with exposed rocky outcrops.

== Description ==
It is a small species of bat, with a forearm length of 35–42 mm (1.4–1.7 in). The fur on its back is long, somewhat silky in texture, and grayish brown, while the fur on its belly is paler. It has a dental formula of 2.1.2.33.1.2.3.

== Range and status ==
The western sheath-tailed bat is endemic to the island and country of Madagascar. So far, it has been documented on the western side of the island, which is karstic. Its elevation range is from 10–330 m (33–1,083 ft) above sea level. As of 2017, it is evaluated as a least-concern species by the IUCN.
