= Laephotis stanleyi =

Scientific classification
- Kingdom: Animalia
- Phylum: Chordata
- Class: Mammalia
- Order: Chiroptera
- Family: Vespertilionidae
- Genus: Laephotis
- Species: L. stanleyi

Binomial name
- Laephotis stanleyi (Goodman, Kearney, Ratsimbazafy & Hassanin, 2017)

Species of bat

Laephotis stanleyi, also called Stanley's serotine, is a species of vesper bat in the genus Laephotis. It is found across southern Africa. The species was formerly known as N. cf. melckorum, before being named as a species in 2017.

== Taxonomy ==
Laephotis stanleyi was described as a new species in 2017. The holotype had been collected in the Okavango Delta of Botswana in April 2009. The species was previously known as N. cf. melckorum ( cf. from Latin confer), before being named Neoromicia stanleyi in honor of William Stanley, who was the mammal collection manager at the Field Museum of Natural History from 1989 to 2015. In 2020, phylogenetic analysis found it to belong to the genus Laephotis rather than Neoromicia.

== Description ==
The species is moderately large-bodied and insectivorous. Its forearm length is 34–39 mm (1.3–1.5 in) and it weighs 6.1–6.8 g (0.22–0.24 oz). It possesses larger cranial features than other species of its genus and is distinguished from N. capensis by a number of bacular characters. It has a dental formula of 2.1.1.33.1.2.3, for a total of 32 teeth.

== Range and habitat ==
The species is found across Zimbabwe, Botswana, and Zambia, and is also presumed to inhabit the northern part of South Africa and Malawi.
