= Neoromicia robertsi =

Conservation status
- Data Deficient (IUCN 3.1)

Scientific classification
- Kingdom: Animalia
- Phylum: Chordata
- Class: Mammalia
- Order: Chiroptera
- Family: Vespertilionidae
- Genus: Neoromicia
- Species: N. robertsi

Binomial name
- Neoromicia robertsi Goodman, Taylor, Ratrimomanarivo & Hoofer, 2012
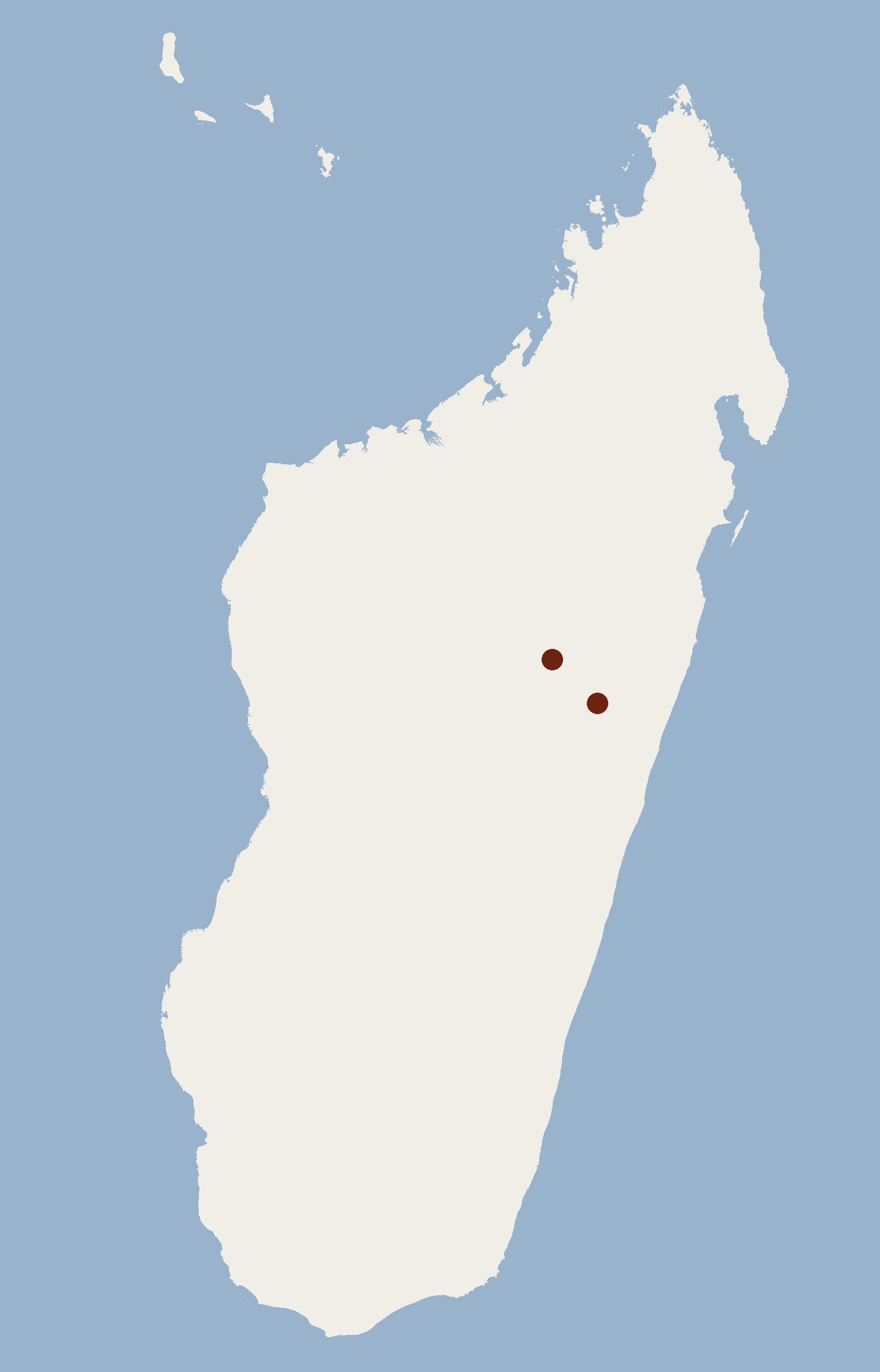
- Range of N. robertsi

Species of bat

Neoromicia robtertsi is a species of vesper bat found in Madagascar. It is a recently described species, as it was first described in 2012.

== Taxonomy and etymology ==
It was described as a new species in 2012. The holotype had been collected in 2002 in a montane forest relatively undisturbed by human impacts. The eponym for the species name "robertsi" is Austin Roberts, a zoologist who studied the bats of southern Africa and devised ways to distinguish species into genera. Its sister taxa is Neoromicia malagasyensis.

== Description ==
Its fur is chocolate brown and distinctly long. Its flight membranes, ears, and tragi are blackish-brown. Its forearm length is 34–38 mm (1.3–1.5 in), and individuals weigh 6.7–11 g (0.24–0.39 oz). It has a dental formula of 2.1.1.23.1.3.3 for a total of 32 teeth.

== Range and habitat ==
It is endemic to Madagascar, where it is found on the eastern half of the island. It has been documented at elevations from 900–1,300 m (3,000–4,300 ft) above sea level. Part of its range overlaps with Andasibe-Mantadia National Park.

== Conservation ==
As of 2017, it is evaluated as a data deficient species by the IUCN. It meets the criteria for this classification because it was recently described and little data has been collected on it so far. Threats faced by this species are unknown, as it is uncommonly encountered.
