= Grandidier's trident bat =

Conservation status
- Vulnerable (IUCN 3.1)

Scientific classification
- Kingdom: Animalia
- Phylum: Chordata
- Class: Mammalia
- Order: Chiroptera
- Family: Rhinonycteridae
- Genus: Paratriaenops
- Species: P. auritus

Binomial name
- Paratriaenops auritus (Grandidier, 1912)
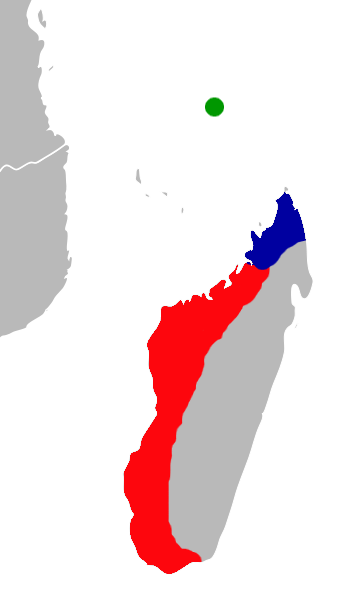
- Distribution of P. auritus (blue), P. furcula (red) and P. pauliani (green)

Synonyms
- Triaenops aurita Grandidier, 1912; Triaenops auritus: Peterson et al., 1995; Paratriaenops auritus: Benda and Vallo, 2009

Species of bat

Grandidier's trident bat (Paratriaenops auritus) is a species of bat in the family Hipposideridae endemic to Madagascar. It was formerly assigned to the genus Triaenops, but is now placed in the separate genus Paratriaenops.

== Taxonomy ==
Guillaume Grandidier first described the species in 1912, as Triaenops aurita, on the basis of a single poorly preserved specimen collected at Diégo-Suarez (now Antsiranana) in northernmost Madagascar. In his 1939 list of African mammals, Glover Morrill Allen placed the species as a synonym of Triaenops furcula (now Paratriaenops furcula) of western Madagascar, and in his 1948 review of the genus Triaenops, Jean Dorst concurred, as did John Edwards Hill, who reviewed the genus in 1982. In their 1995 study of Madagascar bats, however, R.L. Peterson and colleagues reinstated it as a species. They also changed the specific name to auritus, presumably for gender agreement with the generic name Triaenops.

Julie Ranivo and Steven Goodman revised Madagascar Triaenops in 2006 and clarified the distinction between T. auritus of northern Madagascar and the closely related T. furculus of western Madagascar, which have nonoverlapping ranges. Their paper reported the first new material of the species since its original description. They described a third species of this group in 2008—Triaenops pauliani (now Paratriaenops pauliani) from Aldabra in the nearby Seychelles. In 2007 and 2008, Amy Russell and colleagues investigated the relationships among Triaenops species using DNA sequence data; they confirmed the relationship between T. auritus and T. furculus and their status as distinct species. In view of the significant differences between the T. furculus group and other species of Triaenops, Petr Benda and Peter Villa removed the former in 2009 to a separate genus, Paratriaenops. Triaenops still includes the Malagasy species Triaenops menamena (formerly Triaenops rufus), which is widespread in western Madagascar and overlaps with P. auritus and P. furcula in range, and Triaenops goodmani, an extinct species described in 2007 that may also be related to Paratriaenops.

== Description ==
Paratriaenops auritus is a large-eared, short-tailed bat. The fur is reddish gold and is darker above than below. Both males and females are significantly larger than individuals of P. furcula. On its face are the three lancets at the back of the noseleaf that are characteristic of Triaenops and Paratriaenops. As in P. furcula, the three lancets are straight and about equal in length; in Triaenops, the middle lancet is longer and the outer two are curved.

== Distribution and ecology ==
P. auritus has a small range in far northern Madagascar, perhaps south to the Andrafiamena Mountains. It is relatively abundant in its range and occurs in dry forests. It roosts in caves, and the largest colony contains an estimated 2000 bats.

== Conservation status ==
The IUCN Red List lists P. auritus (as Triaenops auritus) as "Vulnerable" because of its small, fragmented, and declining range. Agricultural activities in particular are causing habitat destruction and fragmentation, and disturbance of its cave roosts may pose another threat. However, it occurs in three protected areas—Réserve Spéciale d'Ankarana, Réserve Spéciale d'Analamerana, and a forest at Daraina. The IUCN recommends that conservation efforts be focused on monitoring and protecting the known cave roosts.
