= Triaenops menamena =

- Skull of Triaenops menamena

Conservation status
- Least Concern (IUCN 3.1)

Scientific classification
- Kingdom: Animalia
- Phylum: Chordata
- Class: Mammalia
- Infraclass: Placentalia
- Order: Chiroptera
- Family: Rhinonycteridae
- Genus: Triaenops
- Species: T. menamena

Binomial name
- Triaenops menamena Goodman and Ranivo, 2009
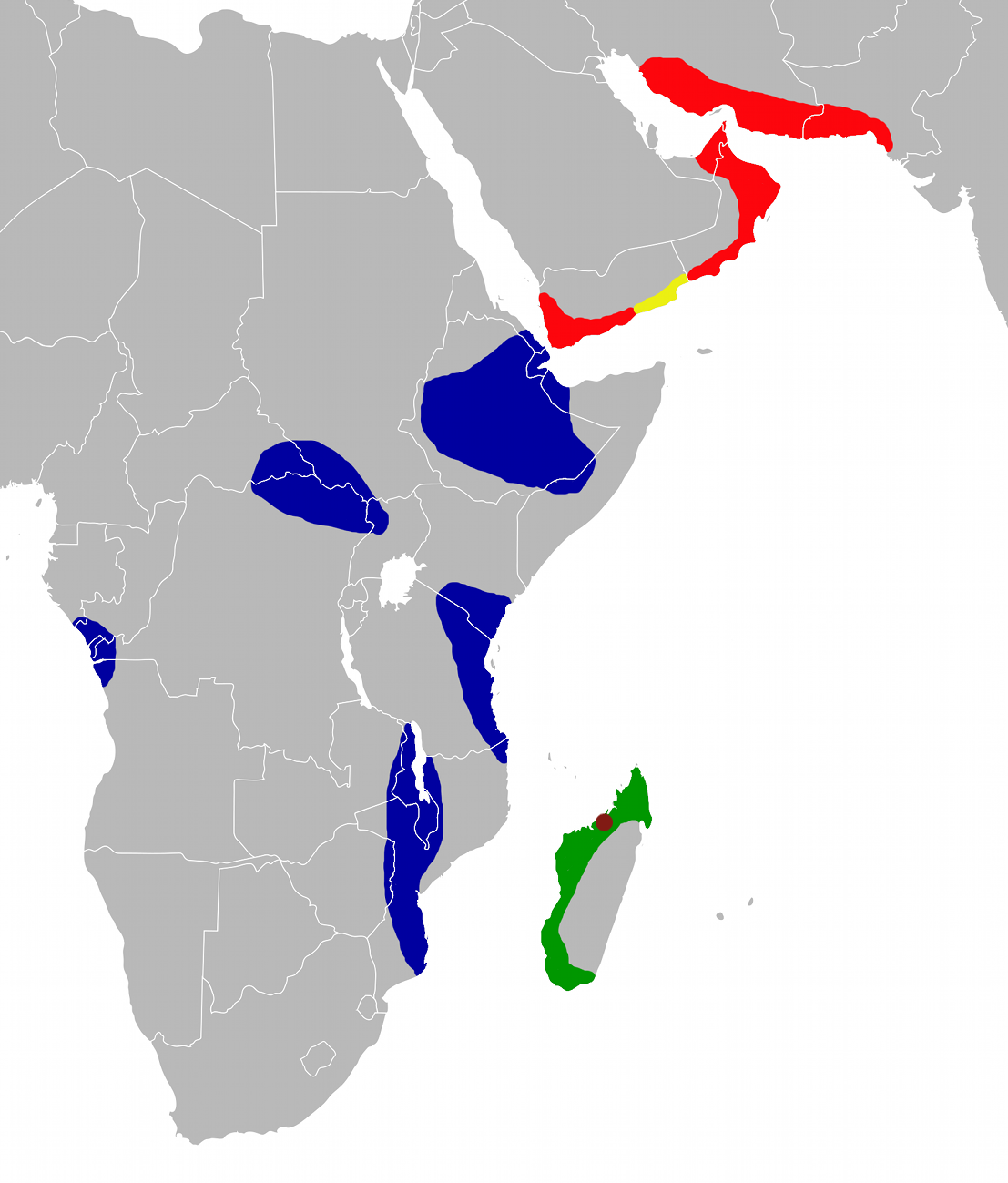
- Distribution of Triaenops menamena (in green) and other species of Triaenops
- Triaenops menamena range

Bat species found in Madagascar

Triaenops menamena is a bat in the genus Triaenops found on Madagascar, mainly in the drier regions. It was known as Triaenops rufus until 2009, when it was discovered that that name had been incorrectly applied to the species. Triaenops rufus is a synonym of Triaenops persicus, a Middle Eastern species closely related to T. menamena— the Malagasy species had previously been placed as a subspecies of T. persicus by some authors. Triaenops menamena is mostly found in forests, but also occurs in other habitats. It often roosts in large colonies and eats insects such as butterflies and moths. Because of its wide range, common occurrence, and tolerance of habitat degradation, it is not considered to be threatened.

With a forearm length of 50 to 56 mm (2.0 to 2.2 in) in males and 46 to 53 mm (1.8 to 2.1 in) in females, this is a medium-sized bat. Its fur color is variable, ranging from reddish brown to gray, but it is generally darker than the species in the closely related genus Paratriaenops which also occur on Madagascar. The skull contains a pronounced swelling around the nose and the second upper premolar is displaced outside the toothrow. The maximum frequency of the echolocation call averages 94.2 kHz and the species can easily be recognized on the basis of its call.

== Taxonomy ==
In 1881, Alphonse Milne-Edwards described two new species in the genus Triaenops on the basis of specimens supposedly collected by Léon Humblot on Madagascar: the reddish Triaenops rufus and the larger, gray T. humbloti. Jean Dorst, who reviewed Madagascan Triaenops in 1947, retained both as separate species; in another review, published in 1982, John Edwards Hill considered the two to represent the same species. In 1994, Karl Koopman considered rufus itself to be part of the Middle Eastern and mainland African species Triaenops persicus, a possibility Hill had discussed, but most authors regarded the two as distinct species. In 2006, Julie Ranivo and Steven Goodman revised Madagascan Triaenops and found little variation among specimens of T. rufus from throughout the dry parts of the island. Three years later, they published another paper which showed that the original material of T. rufus and T. humbloti was distinct from Madagascan specimens identified as "Triaenops rufus" and more similar to T. persicus. On his journey to Madagascar, Humblot had stayed in Somalia and Yemen, and Goodman and Ranivo concluded that he had probably collected the Triaenops there, after which their provenance was incorrectly recorded. Thus, rufus and humbloti cannot be used for the Madagascan species, and Goodman and Ranivo proposed the new name Triaenops menamena for the species formerly known as T. rufus. The specific name menamena is Malagasy for "reddish", referring to the animal's coloration. "Rufous trident bat" has been used as a common name for Triaenops rufus.

Triaenops menamena is currently one of four living species in the genus Triaenops; a 2009 revision by Petr Benda and Peter Vallo split off the African T. afer and the Yemeni T. parvus from T. persicus and removed three other species, including two from Madagascar, to the separate genus Paratriaenops. An extinct species, Triaenops goodmani, is known from northwestern Madagascar. In 2007 and 2008, Amy Russell and colleagues used phylogenetic and coalescent methodologies to investigate the history of the Triaenops group. They found that T. menamena (as T. rufus) was closest to mainland African Triaenops (but did not study Middle Eastern bats) and concluded that T. menamena and the species of Paratriaenops (then still placed in Triaenops) independently reached Madagascar from Africa; the colonization of the island by T. menamena was dated to about 660,000 years ago. Benda and Vallo also studied phylogenetic relationships in Triaenops and included Middle Eastern T. persicus and T. parvus in their analysis. They found little resolution of relationships within Triaenops, but some evidence suggested that T. menamena is more closely related to the Middle Eastern species than to T. afer in mainland Africa; therefore, T. menamena may have reached Madagascar from the Middle East or northeastern Africa. They also placed the split between T. menamena and the other species much further back, at around 4 million years ago.

== Description ==
Measurements
Sex	n (Note: Number of specimens measured.)	Total length	Tail	Hindfoot	Ear	Forearm	Mass
Male	28 (Note: 27mm for total length.)	90–104	27–38	6–9	14–17	50–56	8.2–15.5
Female	67	86–98	28–39	6–9	12–17	46–53	6.6–11.5
Measurements are in millimeters (except weight in grams) and in the form "minimum–maximum".

Triaenops menamena is a medium-sized species with variable fur coloration, ranging from reddish brown to gray. It is larger and darker than Paratriaenops auritus and P. furcula. Among living Triaenops species, it is smaller than T. persicus and T. afer, but somewhat larger than T. parvus. The extinct Triaenops goodmani, which is known only from three mandibles (lower jaws), is also larger. In the complexly shaped noseleaf (a group of fleshy structures around the nose and mouth), T. menamena has the trident structure characteristic of Triaenops and Paratriaenops: three adjacent lancets (projecting structures) on the posterior leaf. In T. menamena, the two outer lancets are shorter than the middle one and curved, whereas the three lancets are more equal in Paratriaenops. The anterior leaf contains a broad, flat, horizontal process and the intermediate leaf contains a pointed process. The ears are small and broad and contain notches on the inner side. The fur is silky and the hairs on the body are about 5 to 6 mm long. The wing membrane is dark and translucent and the end of the tail usually projects from the uropatagium (tail membrane). Males average slightly larger than females. Wingspan is 270 to 305 mm (10.6 to 12.0 in).

The skull is similar to that of Madagascan Paratriaenops, but the premaxilla is longer. The rostrum (front part of the skull) is well-developed and contains a pronounced nasal swelling, which is less pronounced than in Paratriaenops; the depression behind the swelling is relatively shallow. Compared to other species of Triaenops, the rostrum is relatively narrow and short, similar to T. parvus; T. afer and T. persicus have a broader rostrum. The front margin of the rostrum is cast back between the left and right corners. A transverse line passes over the roof of the rostrum. The infraorbital foramen, an opening in the skull, is oblong in shape. The zygomatic arches (cheekbones) are not broadened towards the sides, are connected to the maxillaries by broad bones, and contain clear crests on their upper sides. In T. menamena, these crests are rectangular in form and larger than in Paratriaenops. The braincase is lower than in other species of Triaenops. The sagittal crest, which is on the roof of the braincase, is poorly developed. In the mandible, the coronoid process is blunt and rounded, but the angular process (both processes at the back of the bone) is small.

The upper incisors have two cusps and the upper canine has three—a large central one, a small but well-developed one at the back, and a small cuspule at the front. The front upper premolar is projected outside the toothrow, so that the canine before it and back premolar behind it touch. The first lower incisor has two cusps and the second has three. On the second lower molar, the protoconid cusp is notably taller than the hypoconid; these cusps are about as high in T. goodmani.

The species can easily be identified from recordings of its echolocation call. The call consists of a component with constant frequency followed by a short one with changing frequency. The call takes 6.5 to 13.5 ms, averaging 10.1 ms, and the period between two calls is 22.7 to 86.3 ms, averaging 42.7 ms. The maximum frequency averages 94.2 kHz, the minimum frequency averages 82.0 kHz, and the call emits the most energy at a frequency of 93.2 kHz.

== Distribution and ecology ==
Triaenops menamena mainly occurs in the dry regions of western Madagascar, but has also been recorded in humid areas in the far southeast and northeast, and is found up to 1,300 m (4,270 ft) above sea level. It mainly occurs in forests, but has also been recorded outside forest and is not dependent on it. An obligate cave dweller, it is known to roost in large colonies, with one cave colony estimated to contain over 40,000 bats; this cave also contained an estimated 10,000 Paratriaenops furcula. The effective population size of the species is estimated to be about 121,000. Lepidoptera (butterflies and moths) form the main component of its diet, but it also eats Coleoptera (beetles) and Hemiptera (bugs) and fewer members of some other insect orders. It is unclear how the ecological niches of Triaenops and the less frequently captured Paratriaenops furcula are separated, as both eat lepidopterans and occur in the same regions.

== Conservation status ==
Under Triaenops rufus, the IUCN Red List lists this species as being of "Least Concern", citing its common occurrence over a wide distribution and tolerance of human modifications of its habitat, even though its forest habitat is being destroyed in places. It has been recorded in numerous protected areas. Bats, mainly the large Hipposideros commersoni, are sometimes hunted for food in southwestern Madagascar, and T. menamena is also taken incidentally.

== Literature cited ==
- Benda, P. and Vallo, P. (2009). "Taxonomic revision of the genus Triaenops (Chiroptera: Hipposideridae) with description of a new species from southern Arabia and definitions of a new genus and tribe" (PDF). Folia Zoologica. 58 (Monograph 1): 1–45. Archived from the original (PDF) on 7 November 2010.
- Goodman, S.M. (2006). "Hunting of Microchiroptera in south-western Madagascar". Oryx. 40 (2): 225–228. doi:10.1017/S0030605306000354.
- Goodman, S.M.; Ranivo, J. (2008). "A new species of Triaenops (Mammalia, Chiroptera, Hipposideridae) from Aldabra Atoll, Picard Island (Seychelles)" (PDF). Zoosystema. 30 (3): 681–693. Archived from the original on 2011-06-12.
- Goodman, S.M. and Ranivo, J. (2009). "The geographical origin of the type specimens of Triaenops rufus and T. humbloti (Chiroptera: Hipposideridae) reputed to be from Madagascar and the description of a replacement species name". Mammalia. 73: 47–55. doi:10.1515/MAMM.2009.011.
- David L. Hawksworth; Alan T. Bull, eds. (24 May 2007). Vertebrate Conservation and Biodiversity. Springer. ISBN 978-1-4020-6319-0.
- Kofoky, A.F.; Andriafidison, D.; Ratrimomanarivo, F.H.; Razafimanahaka, H.J.; Rakotondravony, D.; Racey, P.A.; and Jenkins, R.K.B. (2007). "Habitat use, roost selection and conservation of bats in Tsingy de Bemaraha National Park, Madagascar". Biodiversity and Conservation. Topics in Biodiversity and Conservation. 16: 1039–1053. doi:10.1007/978-1-4020-6320-6_14. ISBN 978-1-4020-6319-0.
- Rakotoarivelo, A.A.; Ranaivoson, N.; Ramilijaona, O.R.; Kofoky, A.F.; Racey, P.A.; and Jenkins, R.K.B. (2007). "Seasonal food habits of five sympatric forest microchiropterans in western Madagascar". Journal of Mammalogy. 88 (4): 959–966. doi:10.1644/06-MAMM-A-112R1.1.
- Ranivo, J. and Goodman, S.M. (2006). "Révision taxinomique des Triaenops malgaches (Mammalia, Chiroptera, Hipposideridae)" (PDF). Zoosystema (in French). 28 (4): 963–985. Archived from the original (PDF) on 5 March 2012.
- Russell, A.L.; Ranivo, J.; Palkovacs, E.P.; Goodman, S.M.; and Yoder, A.D. (2007). "Working at the interface of phylogenetics and population genetics: a biogeographical analysis of Triaenops spp. (Chiroptera: Hipposideridae)" (PDF). Molecular Ecology. 16 (4): 839–851. Bibcode:2007MolEc..16..839R. doi:10.1111/j.1365-294X.2007.03192.x. PMID 17284215.
- Russell, A.L.; Goodman, S.M.; and Cox, M.P. (2008). "Coalescent analyses support multiple mainland-to-island dispersals in the evolution of Malagasy Triaenops bats (Chiroptera: Hipposideridae)". Journal of Biogeography. 35: 995–1003. doi:10.1111/j.1365-2699.2008.01891.x.
- Yoshiyuki, M. (1995). "Two rare species of the bats, Triaenops rufus and Mormopterus jugularis (Mammalia, Chiroptera) from Madagascar". Bulletin of the National Science Museum, Tokyo (A). 21 (2): 119–126.
