= Namib long-eared bat =

Conservation status
- Least Concern (IUCN 3.1)

Scientific classification
- Kingdom: Animalia
- Phylum: Chordata
- Class: Mammalia
- Order: Chiroptera
- Family: Vespertilionidae
- Genus: Laephotis
- Species: L. namibensis

Binomial name
- Laephotis namibensis Setzer, 1971

Species of bat

The Namib long-eared bat (Laephotis namibensis) is a species of vesper bat in the family Vespertilionidae found in Namibia. It is found in dry savanna and temperate desert.
