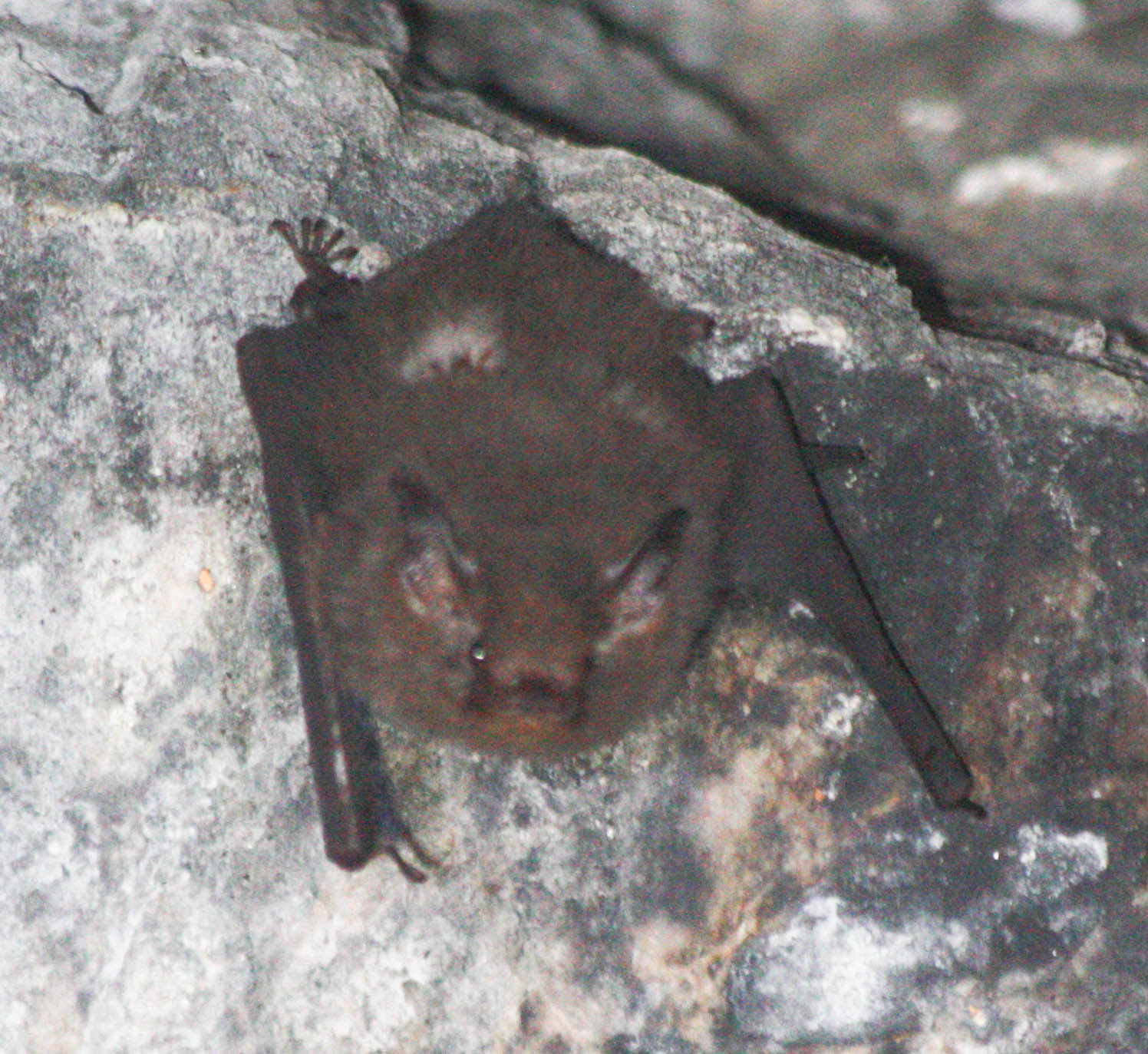

Scientific classification
- Domain: Eukaryota
- Kingdom: Animalia
- Phylum: Chordata
- Class: Mammalia
- Order: Chiroptera
- Family: Emballonuridae
- Genus: Paremballonura; Goodman, Puechmaille, Friedli-Weyeneth, Gerlach, Ruedi, Schoeman, Stanley & Teeling, 2012

= Paremballonura =

Genus of bats

Paremballonura (false sheath-tailed bat) is a genus of bats belonging to the family Emballonuridae.

The species of this genus are found in Madagascar.

== Species ==
Species:

- Paremballonura atrata (Peters, 1874)
- Paremballonura tiavato (Goodman, Cardiff, Ranivo, Russell & Yoder, 2006)
