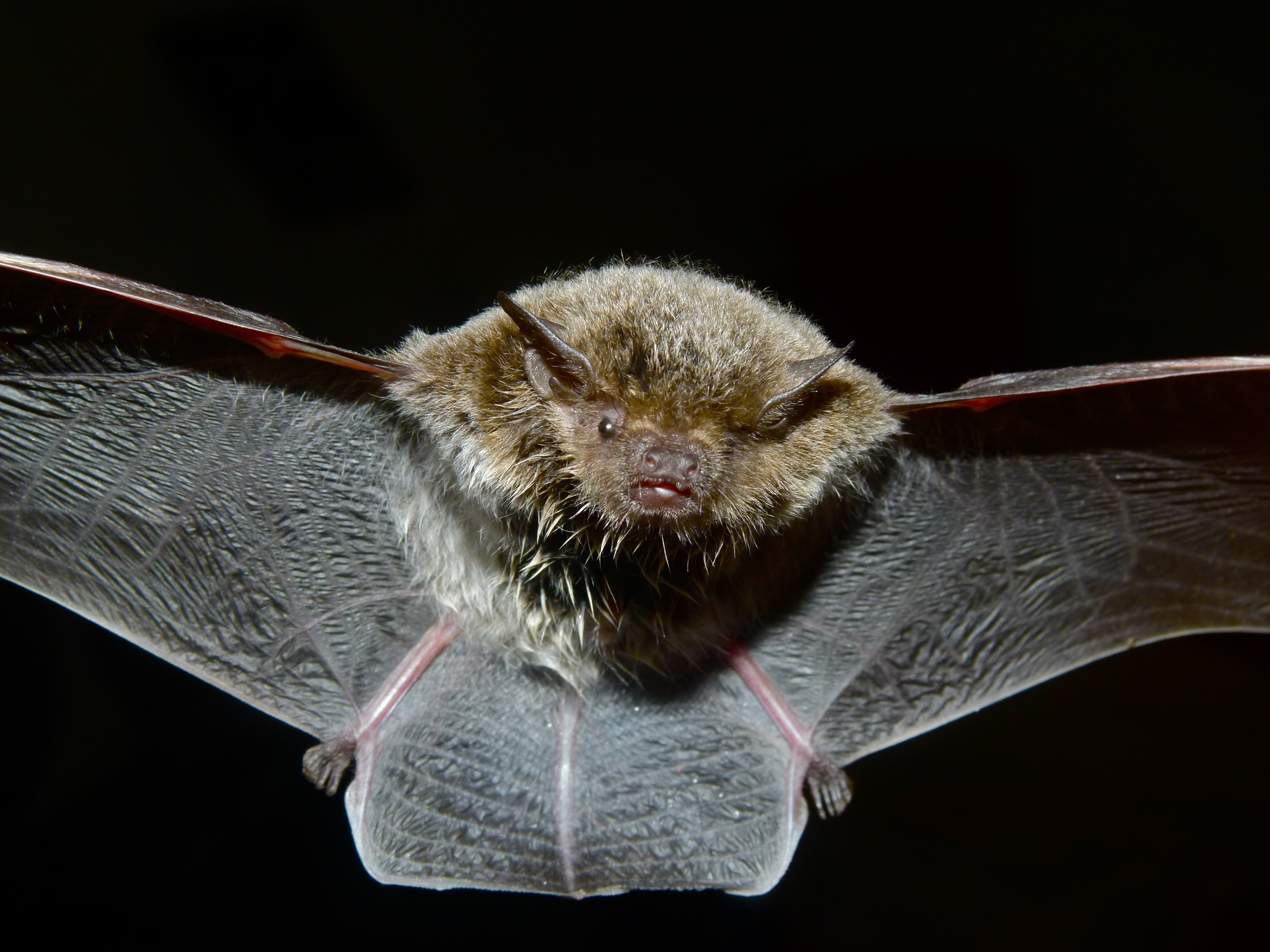
- Cape serotine (L. capensis)

Scientific classification
- Domain: Eukaryota
- Kingdom: Animalia
- Phylum: Chordata
- Class: Mammalia
- Order: Chiroptera
- Family: Vespertilionidae
- Tribe: Vespertilionini
- Genus: Laephotis; Thomas, 1901

Type species
- Laephotis wintoni Thomas, 1901

Species
- See text

= Laephotis =

Genus of bats

Laephotis (known as the African long-eared bat) is a genus of bats in the family Vespertilionidae. Species within this genus are:

- Angolan long-eared bat (Laephotis angolensis)
- Botswanan long-eared bat (Laephotis botswanae)
- Cape serotine (Laephotis capensis)
- East African serotine (Laephotis kirinyaga)
- Isalo serotine (Laephotis malagasyensis)
- Malagasy serotine (Laephotis matroka)
- Namib long-eared bat (Laephotis namibensis)
- Roberts's serotine (Laephotis robertsi)
- Stanley's serotine (Laephotis stanleyi)
- De Winton's long-eared bat (Laephotis wintoni)

Some species in this genus were formerly classified in Neoromicia before phylogenetic analysis placed them in Laephotis.
