= Zulu serotine =

Conservation status
- Least Concern (IUCN 3.1)

Scientific classification
- Kingdom: Animalia
- Phylum: Chordata
- Class: Mammalia
- Order: Chiroptera
- Family: Vespertilionidae
- Genus: Neoromicia
- Species: N. zuluensis

Binomial name
- Neoromicia zuluensis (Roberts, 1924)

Synonyms
- Eptesicus zuluensis Roberts, 1924; Pipistrellus zuluensis (Roberts, 1924)

Species of bat

The Zulu serotine (Neoromicia zuluensis), also called the Zulu pipistrelle, aloe bat, or aloe serotine, is a species of vesper bat found in Angola, Botswana, Democratic Republic of the Congo, Ethiopia, Kenya, Malawi, Namibia, South Africa, South Sudan, Uganda, Zambia, and Zimbabwe. Its natural habitats are savanna and hot deserts.

== Description ==
The Zulu serotine is a very small microbat, with a head-and body length of about 75 mm (3 in), a forearm length of about 30 mm (1.2 in), a wingspan of about 225 mm (9 in) and a weight of between 3 and 6 g (0.1 and 0.2 oz). The fur is soft and dense, and longer on the rump than elsewhere. The dorsal surface is medium brown, the hairs having brownish-black shafts and medium to pale brown tips, while the ventral surface is a paler, greyish-brown, the hairs having dark grey shafts with paler, greyish-brown tips. The wing membranes are dark, usually without a rear white border, and the tail is totally enclosed in the interfemoral membrane.

== Distribution and habitat ==
This bat has a widespread distribution in eastern and southern Africa. Its range consists of a northern population in Ethiopia, South Sudan, Uganda and Kenya, and a southern population extending from Zambia and the south Democratic Republic of the Congo to Angola, Namibia, Zambia, Zimbabwe, Malawi and South Africa. In its northern range, it inhabits semi-desert shrubland and grassland, including light woodland and thickets with Acacia and Commiphora. In its southern range, it inhabits wooded savanna, including miombo woodland, and in the drier southwestern part of its range, bushland and shrubland. Its altitudinal range is from 500 to 2,650 m (1,640 to 8,694 ft).

== Behaviour ==
The flight speed of this bat is moderately fast with high manoeuvrability, and it can bank, twist and stall. It is also able to scramble across the ground and take off from it. It feeds by hawking for insects, using echolocation to locate its prey, primarily feeding on moths and beetles. It hunts in glades and around trees, flying between the trunks and among the branches. It has been observed flying over water, but whether it was feeding or sipping water is unclear. It can produce highly concentrated urine and in captivity can survive for several days without water. Breeding seems to take place early in the wet season, with litters of one or two young being produced. It is unknown where this species roosts in the daytime.
