= Kirindy serotine =

Conservation status
- Least Concern (IUCN 3.1)

Scientific classification
- Kingdom: Animalia
- Phylum: Chordata
- Class: Mammalia
- Order: Chiroptera
- Family: Vespertilionidae
- Genus: Neoromicia
- Species: N. bemainty

Binomial name
- Neoromicia bemainty (Goodman et al., 2015)

Synonyms
- Hypsugo bemainty Goodman et al., 2015

Species of bat

The Kirindy serotine (Neoromicia bemainty) is a species of vesper bat in the family Vespertilionidae. It occurs in the central and south-central portions of western Madagascar. As of the most recent IUCN assessment in May 2016, it is of least concern.

== Taxonomy ==
This species was formerly thought to be related to Neoromicia anchieta, but has now been proven to be a distinct species endemic to Madagascar. Although it was initially described in the genus Hypsugo, later phylogenetic and morphological evidence found it to belong to the genus Neoromicia.

== Distribution and habitat ==
It inhabits the central and south central portions of western Madagascar. It is known to occur in different forested as well as non-forested zones, from 0 to 870 m in elevation. It is also known to occur in the general vicinity of the Kirindy Forest north of Morondava, which is part of the Menabe Antimena protected area; the Zombitse-Vohibasia National Park; the Kirindy Mitea National Park; and Amoron'i Onilahy protected area. There is evidence to suggest that it can tolerate an undefined level of human disturbance to its habitat.

== Threats ==
The habitat it is known to inhabit is known to be under stress from logging and clearance for slash and burn agriculture, although the fact that the species is not strictly dependent on forested areas makes it difficult to assess how much of a threat this poses.
