= Macronycteris besaoka =

Macronycteris besaoka Temporal range: Early Holocene
- Upper mandible

Conservation status
- Extinct

Scientific classification
- Domain: Eukaryota
- Kingdom: Animalia
- Phylum: Chordata
- Class: Mammalia
- Order: Chiroptera
- Family: Hipposideridae
- Genus: Macronycteris
- Species: †M. besaoka

Binomial name
- †Macronycteris besaoka Samonds, 2007

Extinct species of bat

Macronycteris besaoka is an extinct bat from Madagascar in the genus Macronycteris. It is known from numerous jaws and teeth, which were collected in a cave at Anjohibe in 1996 and described as a new species in 2007. The site where H. besaoka was found is at most 10,000 years old; other parts of the cave have yielded H. commersoni, a living species of Hipposideros from Madagascar, and some material that is distinct from both species. M. besaoka was larger than H. commersoni, making it the largest insectivorous bat of Madagascar, and had broader molars and a more robust lower jaw. As usual in Hipposideros, the second upper premolar is small and displaced from the toothrow, and the second lower premolar is large.

== Taxonomy and distribution ==
In 1996, a team led by biologist David Burney collected breccias containing bats and other animals from the cave of Anjohibe in northwestern Madagascar. The bats in the sample were described by Karen Samonds (previously Irwin) in her 2006 Ph.D. dissertation and a 2007 paper. She found several living species in addition to two extinct ones, Triaenops goodmani and Hipposideros besaoka, that she described as new. Hipposideros, the genus to which H. besaoka is assigned, contains the living species Hipposideros commersoni from Madagascar, among many others. The specific name besaoka is the Malagasy for "big chin". The material of H. besaoka is from locality TW-10 within the cave and is about 10,000 years old or younger. A cladistic analysis using morphological data suggests that H. besaoka is most closely related to the mainland African H. gigas and H. vittatus, previously included in H. commersoni, and somewhat more distantly to H. commersoni itself.

Samonds also found Hipposideros material in other sites at Anjohibe, but did not assign it to H. besaoka. In Old SE, also at most 10,000 years old, a single fourth (Note: The two premolars (both upper and lower) in Hipposideros are numbered the second and the fourth, because these tooth correspond to the second and fourth premolars in the ancestral mammalian dentition.) upper premolar (P4) was found with dimensions different from those seen in both H. commersoni and H. besaoka and lacking a cusp on the front lingual (inner) corner, present in both other species; Samonds assigned this specimen to Hipposideros sp. cf. H. commersoni. In NCC-1 (estimated 69,600 to 86,800 years old), a lower incisor and a third lower molar (m3) were found; these teeth resemble H. commersoni and are distinct from H. besaoka, so Samonds assigned them to the former species. Locality SS2, which could not be dated, contained a few teeth and isolated jaws of Hipposideros. Some of these showed measurements distinct from both Hipposideros species, rendering the assignment of the material doubtful; Samonds referred it to H. sp. cf. H. commersoni.

== Description ==
Hipposideros besaoka is known from numerous jaw bones and isolated teeth. The material is identifiable as Hipposideros by the dental formula of 1.1.2.32.1.2.3 (one incisor, one canine, two premolars, and three molars in the upper dentition on both the left and right; two incisors, one canine, two premolars, and three molars in the lower dentition on the left and right); the second upper premolar (P2) is shifted out of the toothrow toward the side of the skull, so that the canine (C1) and P4 touch or nearly touch; and the second lower premolar (p2) is large and has a broad, steep facet on the buccal (outer) side. Morphometric analysis shows that H. besaoka is significantly different from H. commersoni and falls outside the substantial variation within that species. In particular, the upper molars are broader and the mandible (lower jaw) is more robust. In bats, robust mandibles are often associated with a diet that includes hard objects. H. besaoka was the largest insectivorous bat of Madagascar, a position now filled by the smaller H. commersoni.

=== Jaws ===
The premaxillary bones each house a single incisor, which is located at the front tip. They end in a V shape at the front margin and in a narrow point at the back margin. Inside each premaxilla is a large opening, the anterior palatal foramen. The maxillary bone contains the other upper teeth. The mandible ranges from thin to robust and houses the lower teeth.

=== Teeth ===
The upper incisors are small and flat-crowned and are weakly divided into two lobes. A single large cusp is present on C1, with a smaller shelf at the back side. P2 is very small and P4 contains a high cusp at the front, a smaller cusp before it on the inner (lingual) side, and a shelf behind the high cusp. The length of P4 averages 2.13 mm, with a standard deviation (SD) of 0.104 mm, and width is 2.52 mm with an SD of 0.168 mm. On the first upper molar (M1), the protofossa, a basin between cusps at the front of the tooth, is closed. The second molar (M2) is similar, but smaller and more squared. M3 is much smaller and has a reduced crown pattern resembling a W.

The two incisors on each side of the lower jaw are small and have three cusps. The lower canine (c1) has one high and narrow cusp. The second lower premolar (p2) is a large tooth with a high central cusp and high crests connecting this cusp to the front and back edges. A second, smaller cusp is present in the back crest. The fourth premolar (p4) also has a high central cusp; in addition, there are smaller roots before and behind it on the lingual side. This tooth has two roots. In the first lower molar (m1), a large tooth, the cusp complex at the front (the trigonid) is high and the one at the back (the talonid) is lower. Among the cusps of the trigonid, the protoconid is highest and the metaconid and paraconid are lower and about equally high. The cingula (shelves) at the front and the back are low. The second molar (m2) is similar and only a trifle smaller, but m3 is much smaller and has a reduced talonid. Length of m3 averages 2.37 mm (SD 0.098 mm) and width 1.76 mm (SD 0.076 mm).

== Literature cited ==
- Samonds (Irwin), K.E. 2006. The origin and evolution of Malagasy bats: Implications of new Late Pleistocene fossils and cladistic analyses for reconstructing biogeographic history. Ph.D. Dissertation, Department of Anatomical Sciences, Stony Brook University, xx + 403 pp.
- Samonds, K.E. 2007. Late Pleistocene bat fossils from Anjohibe Cave, northwestern Madagascar. Acta Chiropterologica 9(1):39–65.
