= Paratriaenops furcula =

Conservation status
- Least Concern (IUCN 3.1)

Scientific classification
- Kingdom: Animalia
- Phylum: Chordata
- Class: Mammalia
- Infraclass: Placentalia
- Order: Chiroptera
- Family: Rhinonycteridae
- Genus: Paratriaenops
- Species: P. furcula

Binomial name
- Paratriaenops furcula (Trouessart, 1906)
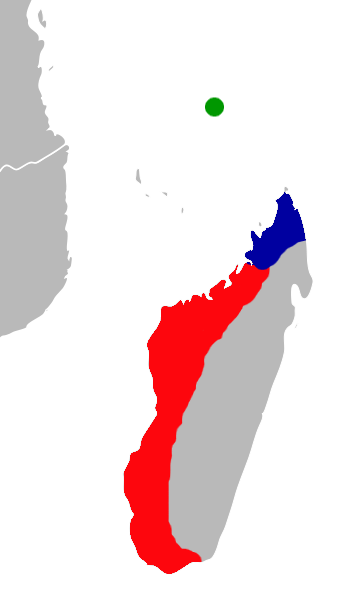
- Distribution of P. furcula (red), P. auritus (blue) and P. pauliani (green)

Species of bat

Paratriaenops furcula, also known as Trouessart's trident bat, is a species of bat in the family Hipposideridae. It is endemic to Madagascar. It was formerly assigned to the genus Triaenops, but is now placed in the separate genus Paratriaenops. A related species, Paratriaenops pauliani, occurs in the Seychelles.

== Discovery ==
Paratriaenops furcula was originally described in 1906 by Édouard-Louis Trouessart under the name Triaenops furcula. The original description was published in the Bulletin du Muséum d'histoire naturelle (Paris). The type locality was recorded as the Grotte de Sarondrana (Sarodrano), in Saint-Augustin Bay on the west coast of Madagascar. The type series is preserved in the Muséum national d'Histoire naturelle (MNHN), Paris.

The species was originally placed in Triaenops. In 2009, Benda and Vallo established the genus Paratriaenops, and Triaenops furcula was subsequently recognised under its current combination, Paratriaenops furcula.
