= Malagasy serotine =

Conservation status
- Least Concern (IUCN 3.1)

Scientific classification
- Kingdom: Animalia
- Phylum: Chordata
- Class: Mammalia
- Order: Chiroptera
- Family: Vespertilionidae
- Genus: Laephotis
- Species: L. matroka

Binomial name
- Laephotis matroka (Thomas & Schwann, 1905)
- Malagasy serotine range

Synonyms
- Neoromicia matroka

Species of bat

The Malagasy serotine (Laephotis matroka), is a species of vesper bat. It is found only in Madagascar. It was formerly classified in Neoromicia before phylogenetic analysis found it to belong to Laephotis.
