= De Winton's long-eared bat =

Conservation status
- Least Concern (IUCN 3.1)

Scientific classification
- Kingdom: Animalia
- Phylum: Chordata
- Class: Mammalia
- Order: Chiroptera
- Family: Vespertilionidae
- Genus: Laephotis
- Species: L. wintoni

Binomial name
- Laephotis wintoni Thomas, 1901

Species of bat

De Winton's long-eared bat (Laephotis wintoni) is a species of vesper bat in the family Vespertilionidae. It can be found in the following countries: Ethiopia, Kenya, Lesotho, South Africa, and Tanzania. It is found in these habitats: dry savanna, Mediterranean-type shrubby vegetation, and subtropical or tropical high-altitude grassland. It is considered a species of Least Concern.
