= Paratriaenops =

Scientific classification
- Domain: Eukaryota
- Kingdom: Animalia
- Phylum: Chordata
- Class: Mammalia
- Order: Chiroptera
- Family: Rhinonycteridae
- Genus: Paratriaenops; Benda and Vallo, 2009
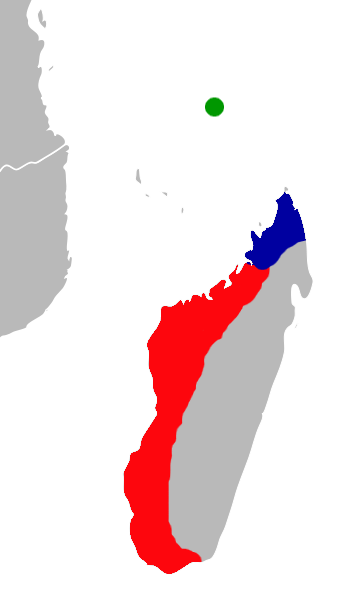
- Distribution of P. auritus (blue), P. furcula (red) and P. pauliani (green)

Genus of bat

Paratriaenops is a genus in the bat family Hipposideridae. It is classified in the tribe Triaenopini, along with the closely related genus Triaenops and perhaps the poorly known Cloeotis. The species of Paratriaenops were placed in Triaenops until 2009. Paratriaenops currently contains the following species:

- Paratriaenops auritus
- Paratriaenops furcula
- Paratriaenops pauliani

P auritus and P. furcula are found on Madagascar, P. pauliani in the Seychelles. The species Triaenops goodmani was described from subfossil material on Madagascar in 2007, before Paratriaenops was erected, but was not considered in the revision that split the genus.

== See also ==
- List of bats of Madagascar

== Literature cited ==
- Benda, P.; Vallo, P. (2009). "Taxonomic revision of the genus Triaenops (Chiroptera: Hipposideridae) with description of a new species from southern Arabia and definitions of a new genus and tribe" (PDF). Folia Zoologica. 58 (1): 1–45. Archived from the original (PDF) on 2016-09-16.
- Samonds, K. E. (2007). "Late Pleistocene bat fossils from Anjohibe Cave, northwestern Madagascar" (PDF). Acta Chiropterologica. 9 (1): 39–65. doi:10.3161/1733-5329(2007)9[39:LPBFFA]2.0.CO;2. Archived from the original (PDF) on 2009-07-18.
