= Botswana long-eared bat =

Conservation status
- Least Concern (IUCN 3.1)

Scientific classification
- Kingdom: Animalia
- Phylum: Chordata
- Class: Mammalia
- Order: Chiroptera
- Family: Vespertilionidae
- Genus: Laephotis
- Species: L. botswanae

Binomial name
- Laephotis botswanae Setzer, 1971

Species of bat

The Botswana or Botswanan long-eared bat (Laephotis botswanae) is a species of vesper bat in the family Vespertilionidae. It can be found in the following countries: Botswana, Democratic Republic of the Congo, Malawi, Namibia, South Africa, Tanzania, Zambia, and Zimbabwe. It is found in savanna and swamps.
