= Melck's house bat =

Conservation status
- Data Deficient (IUCN 3.1)

Scientific classification
- Kingdom: Animalia
- Phylum: Chordata
- Class: Mammalia
- Order: Chiroptera
- Family: Vespertilionidae
- Genus: Neoromicia
- Species: N. melckorum

Binomial name
- Neoromicia melckorum Roberts, 1919
- Known localities of the bat Neoromicia melckorum on Madagascar (mainland African distribution not shown)

Synonyms
- Eptesicus melckorum Roberts, 1919

Species of bat

Melck's house bat (Neoromicia melckorum) is a species of vesper bat. It is found in Democratic Republic of the Congo, Kenya, Malawi, Mozambique, South Africa, Tanzania, Zambia, Zimbabwe and Madagascar. Its natural habitat is savanna.
