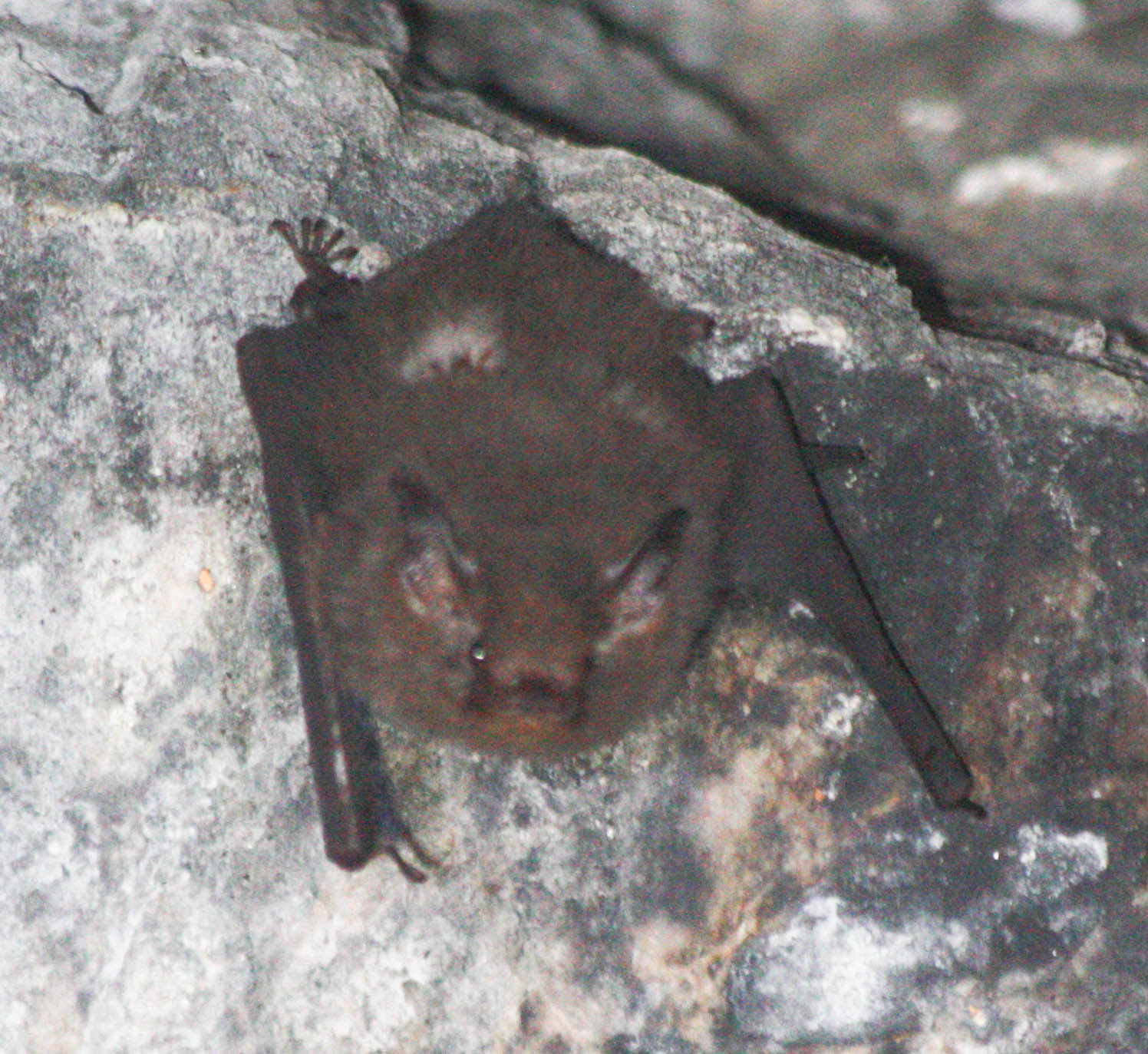

Conservation status
- Least Concern (IUCN 3.1)

Scientific classification
- Kingdom: Animalia
- Phylum: Chordata
- Class: Mammalia
- Order: Chiroptera
- Family: Emballonuridae
- Genus: Paremballonura
- Species: P. atrata

Binomial name
- Paremballonura atrata (Peters, 1874)
- Peters's sheath-tailed bat range

= Peters's sheath-tailed bat =

Species of bat

Peters's sheath-tailed bat (Paremballonura atrata) is a species of sac-winged bat in the family Emballonuridae. It is found only in Madagascar.
