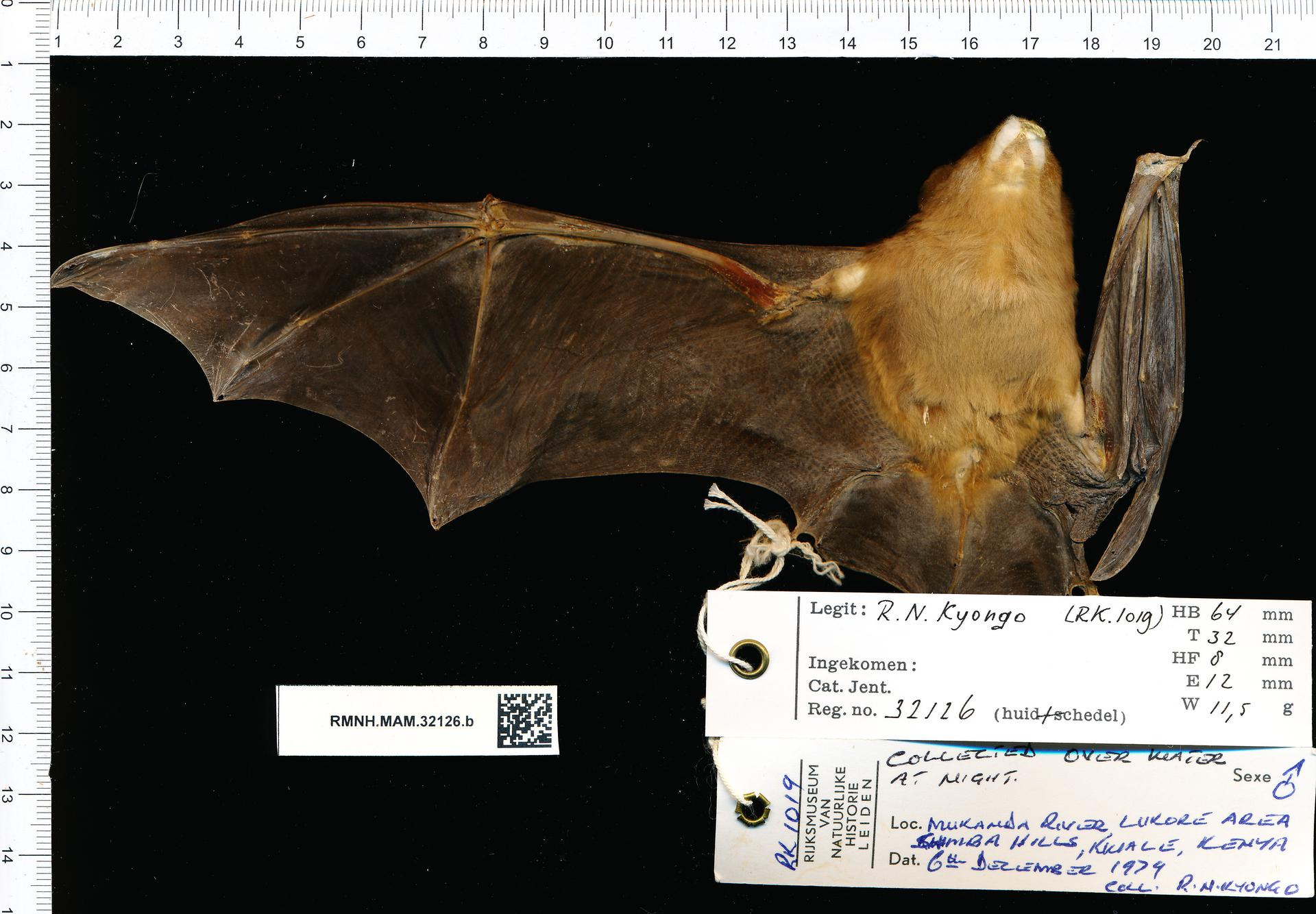

Conservation status
- Least Concern (IUCN 3.1)

Scientific classification
- Domain: Eukaryota
- Kingdom: Animalia
- Phylum: Chordata
- Class: Mammalia
- Order: Chiroptera
- Family: Rhinonycteridae
- Genus: Triaenops
- Species: T. afer

Binomial name
- Triaenops afer Peters, 1877

Synonyms
- Triaenops persicus afer Peters, 1877; Triaenops persicus majusculus Aellen and Brosset, 1968

= African trident bat =

Species of bat

The African trident bat (Triaenops afer) is a species of rhinonycterid (leaf-nosed or nose-leaf) bat found in Africa, from western Central Africa east to coastal Kenya and Mozambique.

== Taxonomy and etymology ==
The African trident bat, Triaenops afer, was first described as a new species in 1877 by German zoologist, Wilhelm Peters. From around 1963 through 2009, the species had been considered a subspecies of the Persian or rufous trident bat (T. persicus), until morphological and genetic analyses showed that it was a distinct species. The generic name Triaenops, from the Greek τριαινόψ ("triainóps"), means "trinity" and possibly refers to the three "points" or openings on the bat's nose, while the specific name "afer" is Latin for "African".

== Biology and ecology ==
It is nocturnal, roosting in sheltered places during the day such as caves or abandoned mines. Roosts can consist of up to half a million individuals, as this is a colonial species.

== Range and habitat ==
Triaenops afer has been documented in Eritrea, Ethiopia (Oromia), Mozambique (Inhambane Province), south Kenya (Kwale, Kilifi, Mombasa, Taita-Taveta Counties), and the southwest of the Republic of the Congo (near the southern Gabon border) into northwestern Angola. Previously thought to be the only species of Triaenops found on mainland Africa, modern morphological, genetic and echolocation analyses have shown that the Rift Valley Triaenops bats, in Kenya, are actually the related Persian trident bat, T. persicus. Elsewhere in the country, including along the Indian Ocean coastline, as well as in the Ethiopian Highlands, the bats were indeed found to be T. afer.
