= Yemeni trident leaf-nosed bat =

Conservation status
- Data Deficient (IUCN 3.1)

Scientific classification
- Kingdom: Animalia
- Phylum: Chordata
- Class: Mammalia
- Order: Chiroptera
- Family: Rhinonycteridae
- Genus: Triaenops
- Species: T. parvus

Binomial name
- Triaenops parvus Benda & Vallo, 2009

Species of bat

The Yemeni trident leaf-nosed bat (Triaenops parvus) is a species of bat found in the Middle East.

== Taxonomy and etymology ==
It was described as a new species in 2009 by Benda and Vallo. Before this, it had been considered synonymous with the rufous trident bat. Its species name "parvus" is Latin for "small", chosen because of its extraordinarily small size compared to other species in its genus.

== Description ==
It is the smallest member of its genus. Its forearm length is 44.7–48.1 mm (1.76–1.89 in). Its fur is beige or brownish-gray in color.

== Range and habitat ==
It has been documented in Yemen and Oman.

== Conservation ==
As of 2017, it is evaluated as a data deficient species by the IUCN. It meets the criteria for this classification because there is inadequate data on its geographic range and biology. However, its known range is restricted.
