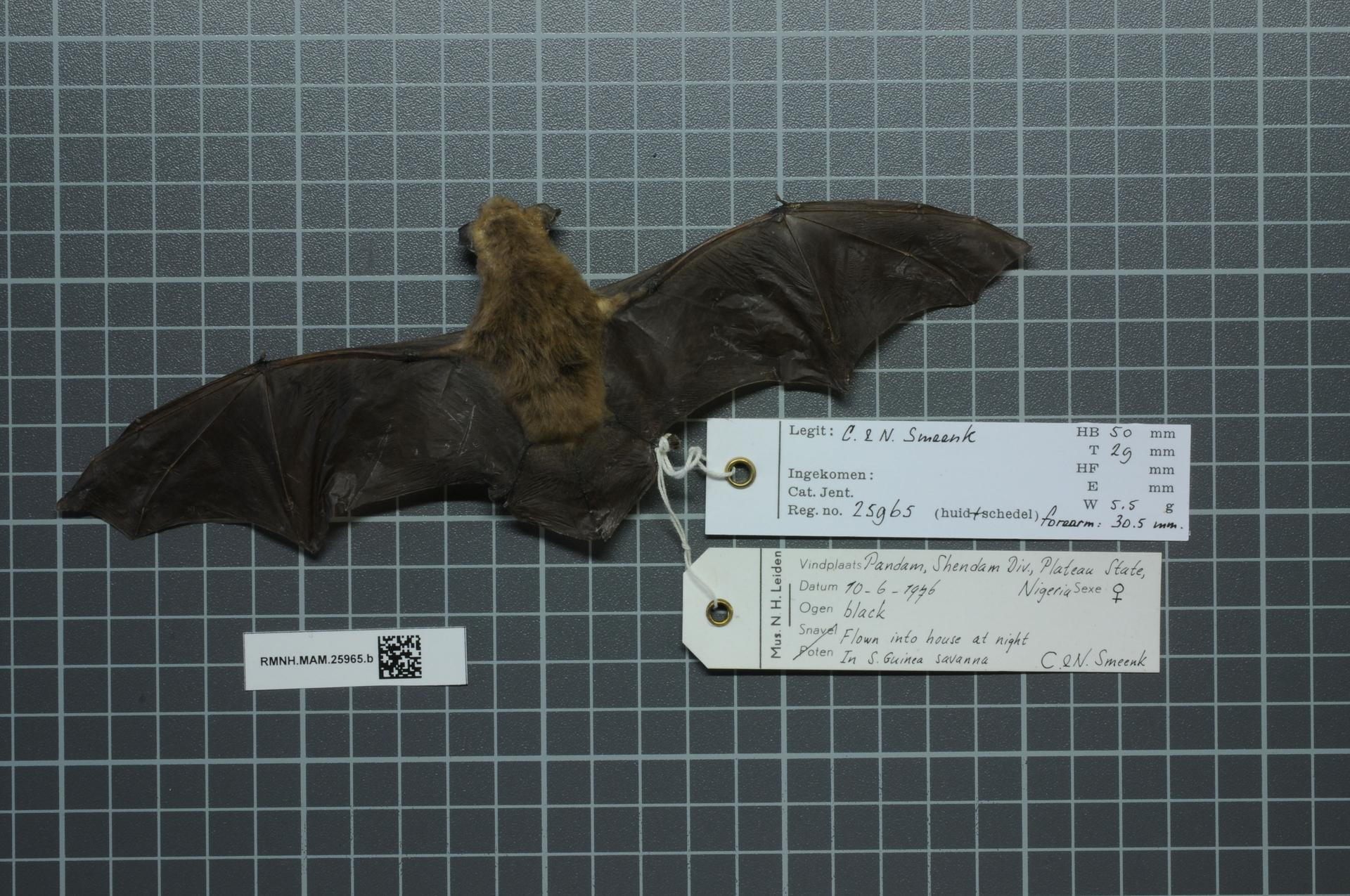

Conservation status
- Least Concern (IUCN 3.1)

Scientific classification
- Kingdom: Animalia
- Phylum: Chordata
- Class: Mammalia
- Order: Chiroptera
- Family: Vespertilionidae
- Genus: Neoromicia
- Species: N. somalica

Binomial name
- Neoromicia somalica (Thomas, 1901)

Synonyms
- Eptesicus somalicus (Thomas, 1901)

= Somali serotine =

Species of bat

The Somali serotine (Neoromicia somalica) is a species of vesper bat. It is found in Benin, Botswana, Burkina Faso, Cameroon, Central African Republic, Chad, Republic of the Congo, Democratic Republic of the Congo, Ivory Coast, Eritrea, Ethiopia, Ghana, Guinea, Guinea-Bissau, Kenya, Liberia, Malawi, Namibia, Nigeria, Rwanda, Senegal, Sierra Leone, Somalia, Sudan, Tanzania, Togo, Uganda, and Zimbabwe. Its natural habitat is savanna.
