= Triaenops =

- Skull of Triaenops menamena

Scientific classification
- Domain: Eukaryota
- Kingdom: Animalia
- Phylum: Chordata
- Class: Mammalia
- Order: Chiroptera
- Family: Rhinonycteridae
- Genus: Triaenops; Dobson, 1871
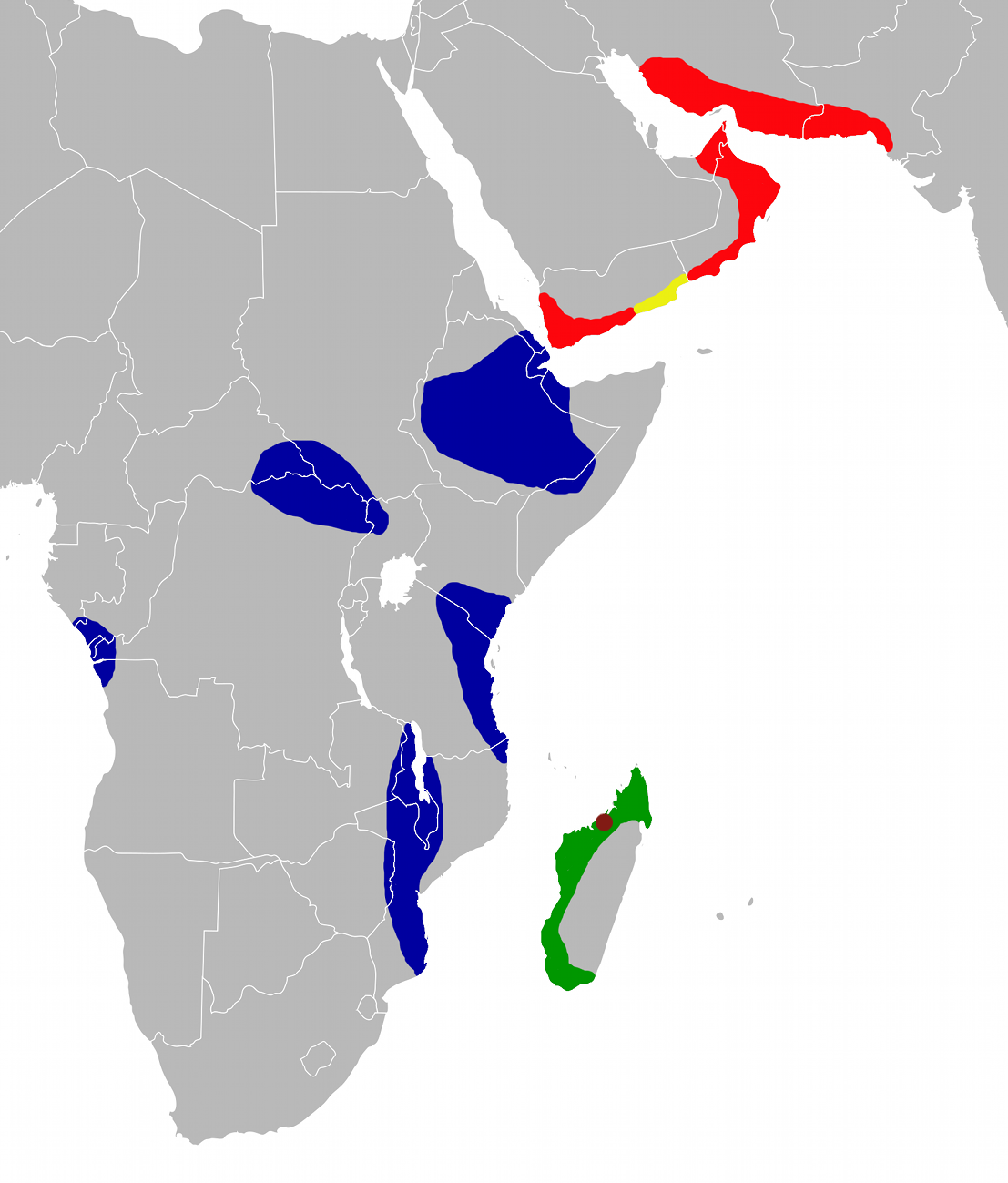
- Distribution of Triaenops (blue—T. afer; brown—†T. goodmani; green—T. menamena; red—T. persicus; yellow—T. persicus plus T. parvus)

Genus of bats

Triaenops is a genus of bat in the family Rhinonycteridae. It is classified in the tribe Triaenopini, along with the closely related genus Paratriaenops and perhaps the poorly known Cloeotis. The species of Paratriaenops, which occur on Madagascar and the Seychelles, were placed in Triaenops until 2009. Triaenops currently contains the following species:

- Triaenops afer
- Triaenops menamena
- Triaenops parvus
- Triaenops persicus

Another species, Triaenops goodmani, was described from subfossil material on Madagascar in 2007, before Paratriaenops was split off, but was not considered in the revision that split the genus.

== See also ==
- List of bats of Madagascar

== Literature cited ==
- Benda, P. and Vallo, P. 2009. Taxonomic revision of the genus Triaenops (Chiroptera: Hipposideridae) with description of a new species from southern Arabia and definitions of a new genus and tribe. Folia Zoologica 58 (Monograph 1):1–45.
- Samonds, K.E. 2007. Late Pleistocene bat fossils from Anjohibe Cave, northwestern Madagascar. Acta Chiropterologica 9(1):39–65.
