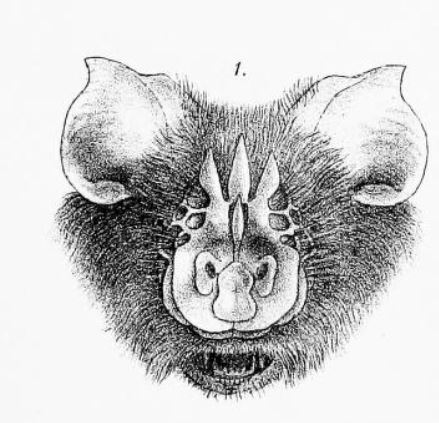

Conservation status
- Least Concern (IUCN 3.1)

Scientific classification
- Kingdom: Animalia
- Phylum: Chordata
- Class: Mammalia
- Order: Chiroptera
- Family: Rhinonycteridae
- Genus: Triaenops
- Species: T. persicus

Binomial name
- Triaenops persicus Dobson, 1871
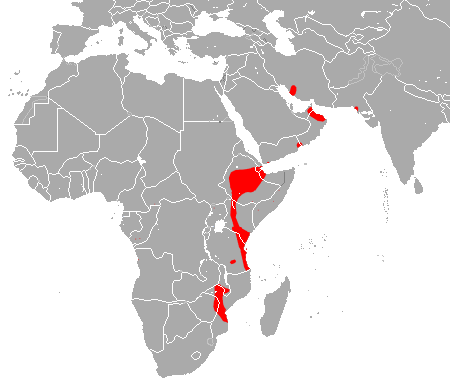
- Persian trident bat range

= Rufous trident bat =

Species of bat

The rufous trident bat, Persian trident bat, or triple nose-leaf bat (Triaenops persicus) is a species of bat in the genus Triaenops. It occurs in southwestern Pakistan, southern Iran, the United Arab Emirates, Oman, and Yemen. In the last country, it occurs together with the much smaller Triaenops parvus. Populations from Madagascar and mainland Africa have also been assigned to T. persicus, but are referable to the species Triaenops menamena and Triaenops afer, respectively. Madagascar populations have also been referred to as Triaenops rufus, but this name is a synonym of T. persicus.

Findings from a study incorporating morphological data and echolocation calls have suggested that populations in the Rift Valley in Kenya (Nakuru, Baringo, and Pokot counties), previously believed to be Triaenops afer, are actually populations of T. persicus, although with some differentiation from the Middle Eastern populations in terms of both cranial morphology and vocalisations.
