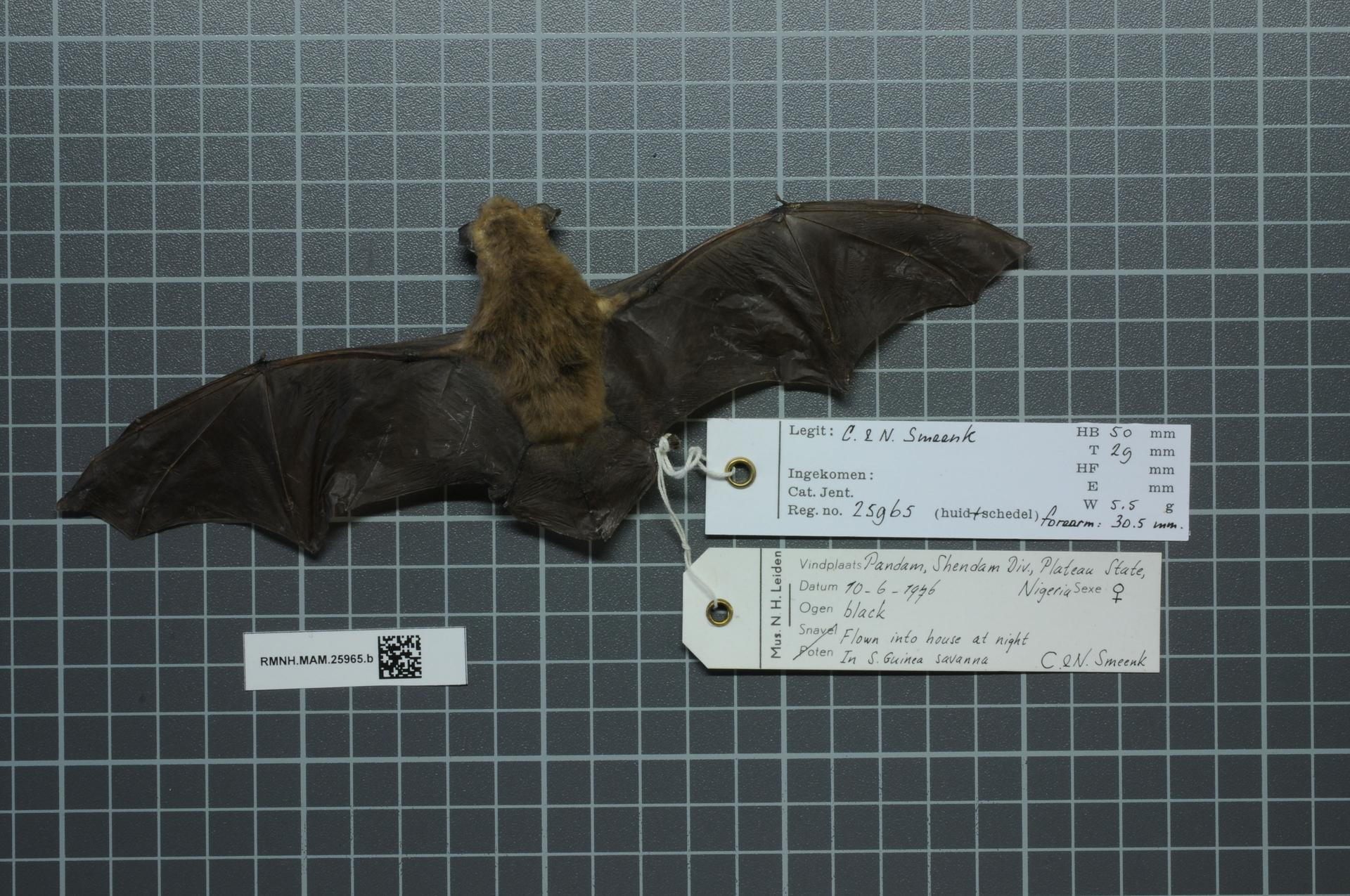
- Somali serotine (N. somalica)

Scientific classification
- Domain: Eukaryota
- Kingdom: Animalia
- Phylum: Chordata
- Class: Mammalia
- Order: Chiroptera
- Family: Vespertilionidae
- Subfamily: Vespertilioninae
- Tribe: Vespertilionini
- Genus: Neoromicia; Roberts, 1926

Type species
- Eptesicus zuluensis Roberts, 1924

Species
- See text

= Neoromicia =

Genus of bats

Neoromicia is a genus of vesper bat in the family Vespertilionidae. It contains the following species:

- Anchieta's serotine (Neoromicia anchietae)
- Kirindy serotine (Neoromicia bemainty)
- Yellow serotine (Neoromicia flavescens)
- Tiny serotine (Neoromicia guineensis)
- Melck's house bat (Neoromicia melckorum)
- Somali serotine (Neoromicia somalica)
- Zulu serotine (Neoromicia zuluensis)

This genus formerly contained many more species, but most of these were reclassified into Afronycteris, Laephotis, or Pseudoromicia.
