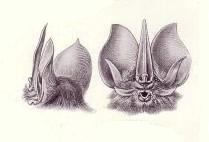
- Tomes's sword-nosed bat (Lonchorhina aurita)

Scientific classification
- Domain: Eukaryota
- Kingdom: Animalia
- Phylum: Chordata
- Class: Mammalia
- Order: Chiroptera
- Family: Phyllostomidae
- Subfamily: Phyllostominae; Gray, 1825

Genera
- Chrotopterus; Glyphonycteris; Lampronycteris; Lonchorhina; Lophostoma; Macrophyllum; Macrotus; Micronycteris; Mimon; Neonycteris; Phylloderma; Phyllostomus; Tonatia; Trachops; Trinycteris; Vampyrum

= Phyllostominae =

Subfamily of bats

Phyllostominae is a subfamily of bats that include big-eared, spear-nosed, sword-nosed bats and relatives.

== List of species ==
- Subfamily: Phyllostominae
  - Tribe Micronycterini
    - Genus: Glyphonycteris
      - Behn's bat, Glyphonycteris behnii
      - Davies's big-eared bat, Glyphonycteris daviesi
      - Tricolored big-eared bat, Glyphonycteris sylvestris
    - Genus: Lampronycteris
      - Yellow-throated big-eared bat, Lampronycteris brachyotis
    - Genus: Macrotus - big-eared bats
      - California leaf-nosed bat, Macrotus californicus
      - Waterhouse's leaf-nosed bat, Macrotus waterhousii
    - Genus: Micronycteris - little big-eared bats
      - Brosset's big-eared bat, Micronycteris brosseti
      - Giovanni's big-eared bat, Micronycteris giovanniae
      - Hairy big-eared bat, Micronycteris hirsuta
      - Pirlot's big-eared bat, Micronycteris homezi
      - Matses' big-eared bat, Micronycteris matses
      - little big-eared bat, Micronycteris megalotis
      - Common big-eared bat, Micronycteris microtis
      - white-bellied big-eared bat, Micronycteris minuta
      - Sanborn's big-eared bat, Micronycteris sanborni
      - Schmidts's big-eared bat, Micronycteris schmidtorum
    - Genus: Neonycteris
      - Least big-eared bat, Neonycteris pusilla
    - Genus: Trinycteris
      - Niceforo's big-eared bat, Trinycteris nicefori
  - Tribe Vampyrini
    - Genus: Chrotopterus
      - big-eared woolly bat, Chrotopterus auritus
    - Genus: Lophostoma
      - Equatorial round-eared bat, Lophostoma aequatorialis
      - Pygmy round-eared bat, Lophostoma brasiliense
      - Carriker's round-eared bat, Lophostoma carrikeri
      - Davis's round-eared bat, Lophostoma evotis
      - Schultz's round-eared bat, Lophostoma schulzi
      - White-throated round-eared bat, Lophostoma silvicolum
      - Yasuni round-eared bat, Lophostoma yasuni
    - Genus: Tonatia - round-eared bats
      - Greater round-eared bat, Tonatia bidens
      - Stripe-headed round-eared bat, Tonatia saurophila
    - Genus: Trachops
      - Fringe-lipped bat, Trachops cirrhosus
    - Genus: Vampyrum
      - Spectral bat, Vampyrum spectrum
  - Tribe Lonchorhinini
    - Genus: Lonchorhina - sword-nosed bats
      - Tomes's sword-nosed bat, Lonchorhina aurita
      - Fernandez's sword-nosed bat, Lonchorhina fernandezi
      - Northern sword-nosed bat, Lonchorhina inusitata
      - Marinkelle's sword-nosed bat, Lonchorhina marinkellei
      - Orinoco sword-nosed bat, Lonchorhina orinocensis
    - Genus: Macrophyllum
      - Long-legged bat, Macrophyllum macrophyllum
    - Genus: Mimon - Gray's spear-nosed bats
      - Golden bat, Mimon bennettii
      - Cozumelan golden bat, Mimon cozumelae
      - Striped hairy-nosed bat, Mimon crenulatum
      - Koepcke's spear-nosed bat, Mimon koepckeae
  - Tribe Phyllostomatini
    - Genus: Phylloderma - Peters's spear-nosed bat
      - Pale-faced bat, Phylloderma stenops
    - Genus: Phyllostomus - spear-nosed bats
      - Pale spear-nosed bat, Phyllostomus discolor
      - Lesser spear-nosed bat, Phyllostomus elongatus
      - Greater spear-nosed bat, Phyllostomus hastatus
      - Guianan spear-nosed bat, Phyllostomus latifolius
