= Yates's big-eared bat =

Conservation status
- Data Deficient (IUCN 3.1)

Scientific classification
- Kingdom: Animalia
- Phylum: Chordata
- Class: Mammalia
- Order: Chiroptera
- Family: Phyllostomidae
- Genus: Micronycteris
- Species: M. yatesi

Binomial name
- Micronycteris yatesi Siles, Brooks, Aranibar, Tarifa, Vargas, Rojas, & Baker, 2013
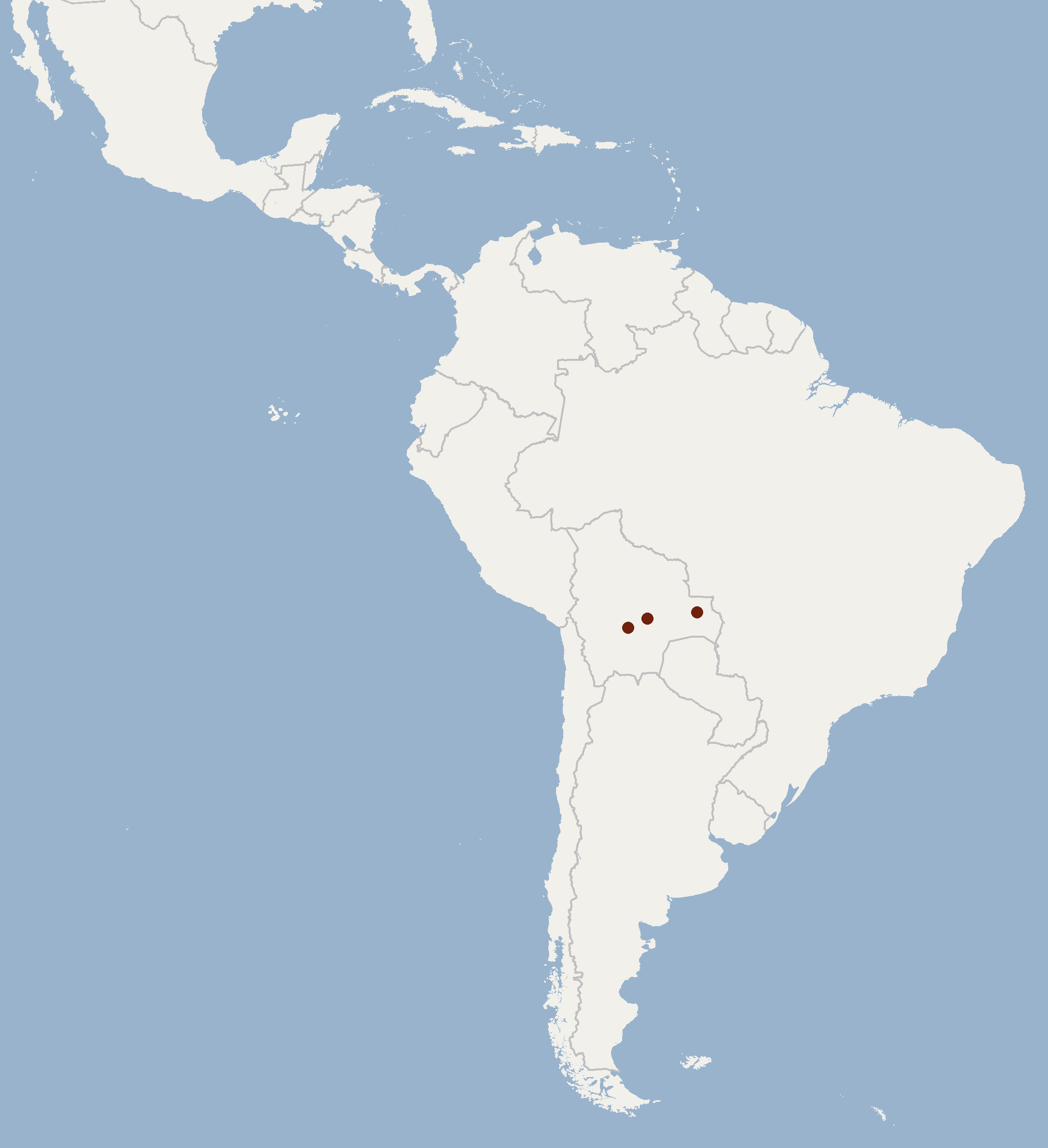
- Range map

Species of bat

Yates's big-eared bat (Micronycteris yatesi) is a species of leaf-nosed bat found in Bolivia.

== Taxonomy and etymology ==
Yates's big-eared bat was described as a new species in 2013. The holotype had been collected in February 2007. The eponym for the species name "yatesi" is Terry Lamon Yates, "for his pivotal contributions to the knowledge of Bolivian mammals, training Bolivian biologists, and starting collaborations that strengthened mammalian research and shaped current science and field biology in Bolivia."

== Description ==
It has a forearm length of 34.5–36.7 mm (1.36–1.44 in). It has long fur, which measures 8–10 mm (0.31–0.39 in) at its shoulders. Individual hairs are bicolored, with the basal half whitish and the tip brown. Its throat fur is white, while the rest of its ventral fur is buffy. It has long ears, measuring 15.5–18.3 mm (0.61–0.72 in). It has a dental formula of 2.1.2.32.1.3.3 for a total of 34 teeth.

== Range and habitat ==
It has been documented in several parts of Bolivia, including Oropeza Province, Chiquitos Province, and Florida Province. These three localities range from 220–1,800 m (720–5,910 ft) above sea level. This species also possibly occurs in Brazil, based on a Micronycteris specimen identified as Sanborn's big-eared bat that could actually have been Yates's big-eared bat.

== Conservation ==
As of 2017, it is listed as a data deficient species by the IUCN. It meets the criteria for this classification because there is little information regarding its population status or the extent of its geographic range.
