= Brosset's big-eared bat =

Conservation status
- Data Deficient (IUCN 3.1)

Scientific classification
- Kingdom: Animalia
- Phylum: Chordata
- Class: Mammalia
- Order: Chiroptera
- Family: Phyllostomidae
- Genus: Micronycteris
- Species: M. brosseti

Binomial name
- Micronycteris brosseti Simmons & Voss, 1998
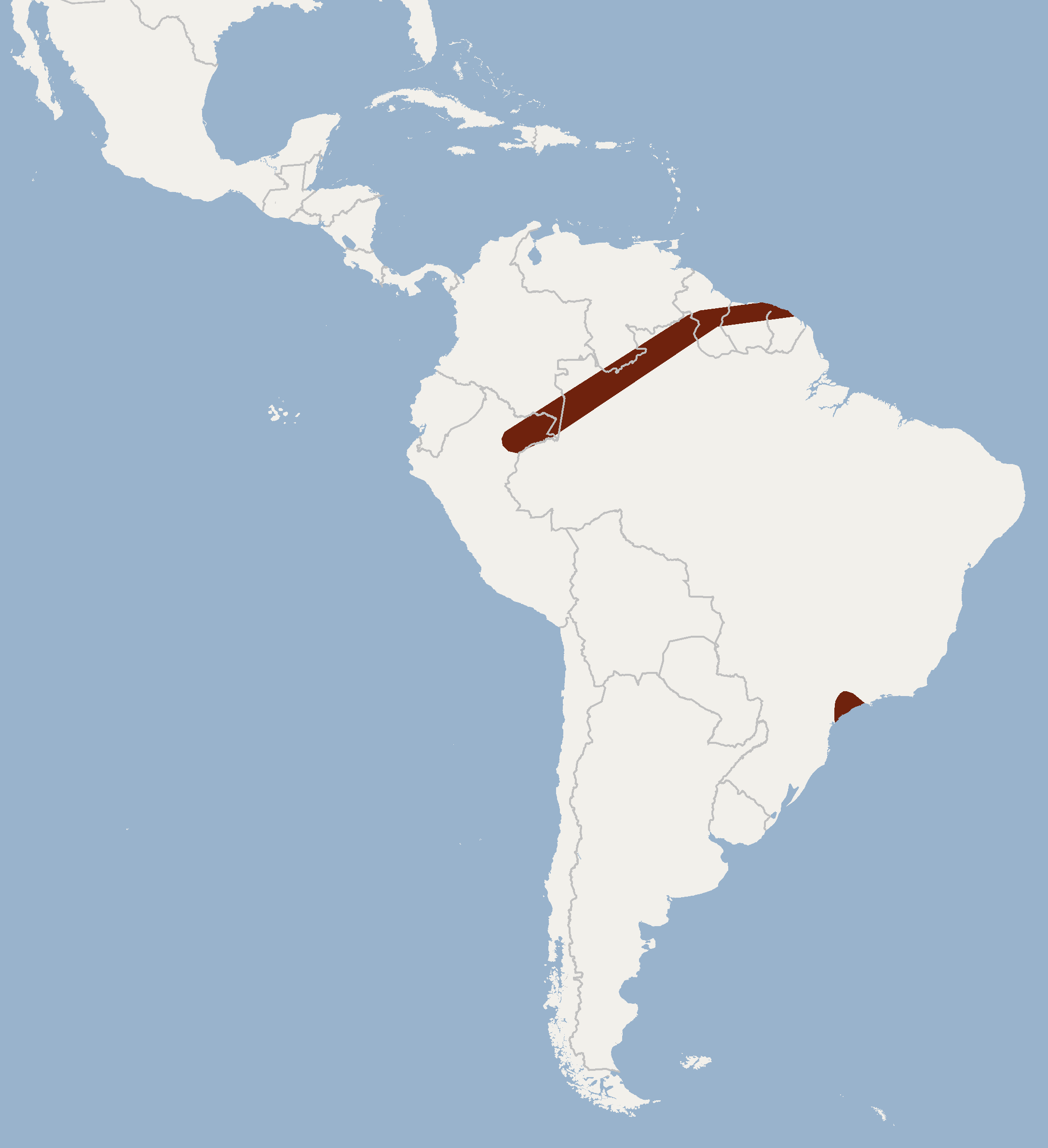

Species of bat

Brosset's big-eared bat (Micronycteris brosseti) is a bat species found in Brazil, French Guiana, Guyana and Peru. It feeds on insects and sometimes fruit and the exact population is unknown. The only listed threat is deforestation.
