= Nimba myotis =

Conservation status
- Critically Endangered (IUCN 3.1)

Scientific classification
- Kingdom: Animalia
- Phylum: Chordata
- Class: Mammalia
- Order: Chiroptera
- Family: Vespertilionidae
- Genus: Myotis
- Species: M. nimbaensis

Binomial name
- Myotis nimbaensis Simmons et al., 2021

Species of bat

The Nimba myotis (Myotis nimbaensis), also known as the orange-furred bat or Nimba Mountain bat, is a species of bat in the family Vespertilionidae. The species is endemic to the Nimba Mountains in Guinea, West Africa. It was discovered in 2018 and officially described in 2021 by a team of scientists from the American Museum of Natural History in partnership with a team from The University of Cameroon, which was led by American mammalogist Nancy Simmons.

== Description ==
M. nimbaensis has orange fur with black dichromatic wing pigmentation. It lives in natural caves and adits (abandoned mine shafts) in the Nimba mountain range. The expedition of researchers went out searching for Lamotte's roundleaf bat (Hipposideros lamottei) and accidentally captured M. nimbaensis in their nets. One of the most fascinating aspects from the study is that researchers believe that there might still be species in the clade that they have yet to discover because of the amount of gene flow between the eleven known species.

Nimba myotis are characteristically recognized to have long, slender ears, wide noses, and tall dagger-like upper canines. They are a physically small species, weighing on average twenty grams. Similar to other bat species, females are typically slightly larger than males.

== Diagnostic features ==
To determine that the bat they captured was a unique species the research team had to distinguish it from species that they are closely related to (M. tricolor and M. welwitschii). To do this they analyzed the bone structure of each of the species. They also looked at the wing membrane to compare and contrast the differences for each of the species. This finding has helped the researchers trace more of the genus and connect the dots between where the species live. Researchers believe that they might have relatives that came from South Africa and Liberia. They have also found another species that will be protected by the creation of tunnel passageways to replace the shafts of the mines.

== Diet ==
The diet of M. nimbaensis is unknown. One could suspect that the diet would resemble that of their near relative the Cape hairy bat (M. tricolor). The cape hairy bat eats species like beetles, tree bugs, flies, and ants. Since both species live in the caves there could be a similarity in the type of diet.

== Similar species ==
While M. nimbaensis is visually similar to M. welwitschii, it most genetically resembles M. tricolor. M. nimbaensis was captured while looking for H. lamottei.

== Habitat ==
M. nimbaensis is believed to only inhabit a small geographic range, the Nimbian Mountain range. The range has lowland rainforests with the slopes covered by grass land vegetation. The Guinea, Liberia, and Côte d'Ivoire boundary is formed as a result of the Cavalla and Nuon rivers that run through the mountain range. Home to thousands of endangered species the Nimbia Mountains support exceptional biodiversity which also includes many other bat species. Temperatures can range from 27 degrees in the day to dropping to around 10 degrees at night. The mountains contain large amounts of iron-ore deposits that caused Liberian Mineral companies to mine in the Guinean section of the range, and that is why the research team was on sight in the mountain range. M. nimbaensis and H. lamottei live in the abandoned mining caves and use the tunnels as their passageways to travel throughout the mines. The team was sent as part of a plan to find ways for the species to travel through the mountains if the mines were to eventually collapse. They are on the critically endangered list.

== See also ==
- List of living mammal species described in the 2020s
