= Micronycteris giovanniae =

Conservation status
- Data Deficient (IUCN 3.1)

Scientific classification
- Kingdom: Animalia
- Phylum: Chordata
- Class: Mammalia
- Order: Chiroptera
- Family: Phyllostomidae
- Genus: Micronycteris
- Species: M. giovanniae

Binomial name
- Micronycteris giovanniae Baker & Fonseca, 2007

Species of bat

Micronycteris giovanniae is a species of leaf-nosed bat found in Ecuador.

== Taxonomy and etymology ==
It was described as a new species in 2007. The holotype had been collected in 2001. This holotype represents the only individual documented of this species as of 2016. The eponym for the species name "giovanniae" is American poet Nikki Giovanni, "in recognition of her poetry and writings." Based on analysis of the cytochrome b gene, its closest relative is the Matses' big-eared bat, M. matses.

== Description ==
It is a medium-sized member of the genus Micronycteris. Unlike some species of the genus, its belly fur is dark. The only known individual of this species had a forearm length of 37 mm (1.5 in) and weighed 8.6 g (0.30 oz). It is a diploid organism with a karyotype of 2n = 40 and a fundamental number (FN) of 68. It has a dental formula of 2.1.2.32.1.3.3 for a total of 34 teeth.

== Location and habitat ==
The single individual known from this species was documented in Esmeraldas Province of Ecuador. It was found within a secondary forest that was in the process of being deforested.
