= Saint Vincent big-eared bat =

Conservation status
- Data Deficient (IUCN 3.1)

Scientific classification
- Kingdom: Animalia
- Phylum: Chordata
- Class: Mammalia
- Order: Chiroptera
- Family: Phyllostomidae
- Genus: Micronycteris
- Species: M. buriri

Binomial name
- Micronycteris buriri Larsen, Siles, Pedersen & Kwiecinski, 2011

Species of bat

The Saint Vincent big-eared bat (Micronycteris buriri) is a bat species found on the island of Saint Vincent in Saint Vincent and the Grenadines.
