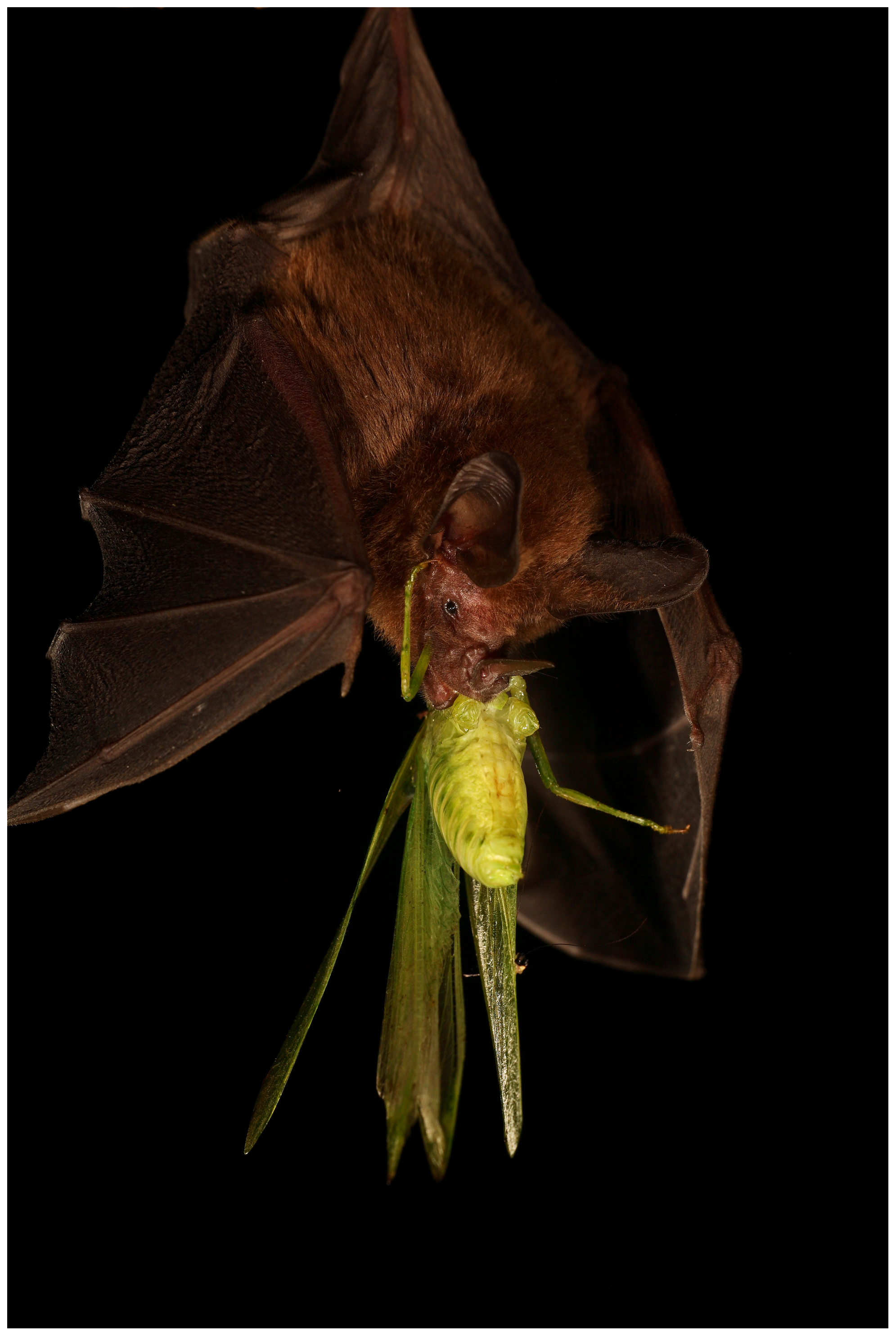

Conservation status
- Least Concern (IUCN 3.1)

Scientific classification
- Kingdom: Animalia
- Phylum: Chordata
- Class: Mammalia
- Order: Chiroptera
- Family: Phyllostomidae
- Genus: Micronycteris
- Species: M. microtis

Binomial name
- Micronycteris microtis Miller, 1898
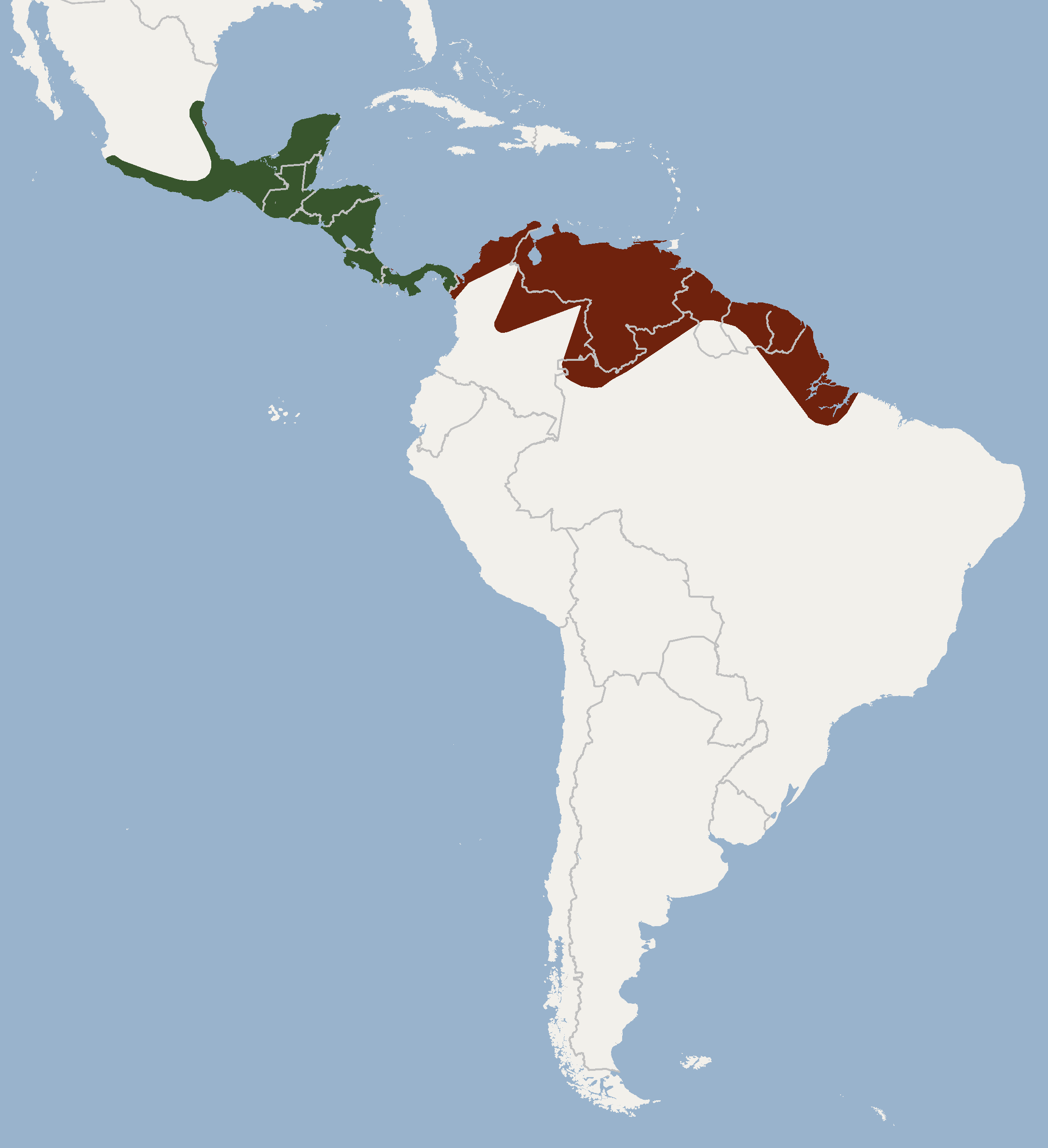

= Common big-eared bat =

Species of bat

The common big-eared bat (Micronycteris microtis) is a bat species from South and Central America. It is a member of the family Phyllostomidae.

Recent research has demonstrated this bat's ability to find motionless food within clutter. Echolocating bats discriminate between background and prey based on glints or Doppler shifts in the echo induced by the (wing-)movements of the prey, but M. microtis can detect completely motionless prey. The species shares both the leaf-nose formation and the trait of sound emission through the nostrils with all Phyllostomidae, but its behavior is understood to be unique: the bat is able to discriminate ecologically relevant stimuli within an extremely complex cluttered sonic environment.

The echolocation call of M. microtis is a broad band multi-harmonic FM sweep with most energy in the second harmonic between 95 and 75 kHz, i.e. quite similar to that of Macrophyllum macrophyllum, although presumably of lower intensity.

M. microtis mothers will provide pups with prey items for 5 months after weaning.

== Description ==
It is a small species of bat with individuals weighing 3.4–9.1 g (0.12–0.32 oz). Its forearm length is 32–38 mm (1.3–1.5 in). Its ears are large and rounded, at 18–23 mm (0.71–0.91 in) long. Its ears are connected by an inter-auricular membrane. Its fur is brown, with geographic variation in the shade of brown. Its dental formula is 2.1.2.32.1.3.3 for a total of 34 teeth.

== Range and habitat ==
It is found in Belize, Bolivia, Brazil, Colombia, Costa Rica, El Salvador, French Guiana, Guatemala, Guyana, Honduras, Mexico, Nicaragua, Panama, and Venezuela
