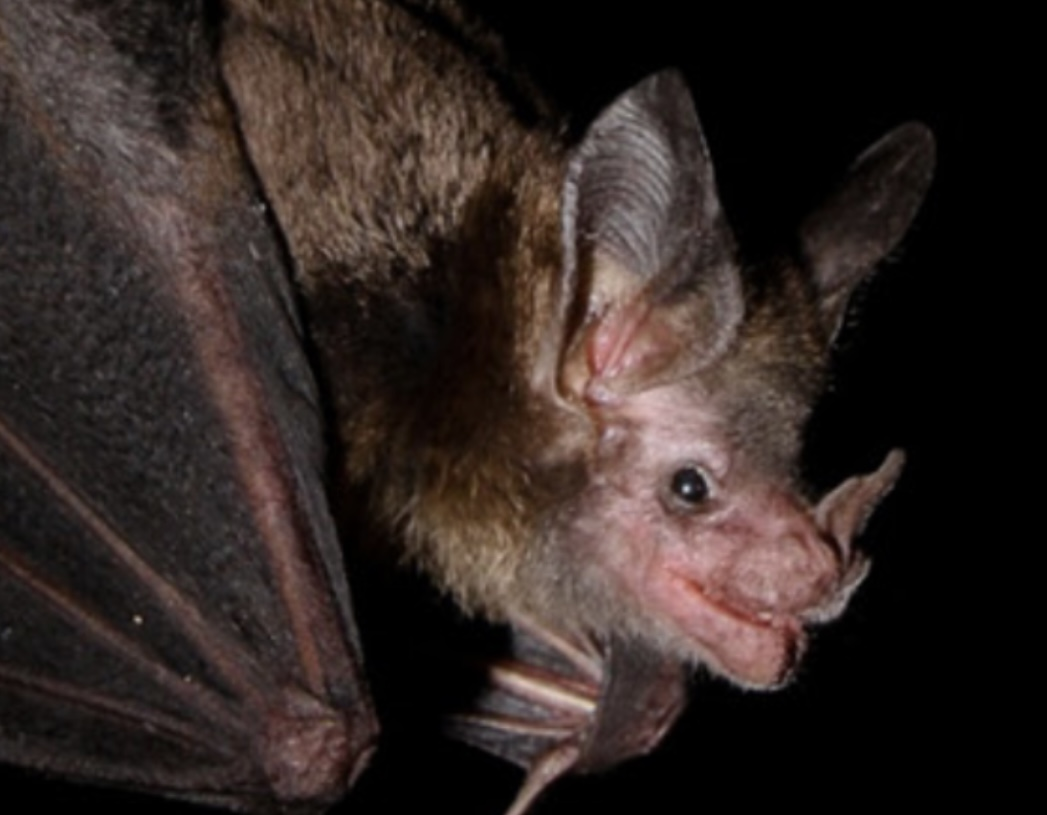

Conservation status
- Data Deficient (IUCN 3.1)

Scientific classification
- Kingdom: Animalia
- Phylum: Chordata
- Class: Mammalia
- Order: Chiroptera
- Family: Phyllostomidae
- Genus: Tonatia
- Species: T. bidens

Binomial name
- Tonatia bidens Spix, 1823

= Greater round-eared bat =

Species of bat

The greater round-eared bat (Tonatia bidens) is a bat species found in northeastern and southern Brazil, northern Argentina, Paraguay and Bolivia. The species feeds on fruit as well as hunting small birds. Once caught, birds are taken to a shelter and consumed.
