= White-bellied big-eared bat =

Conservation status
- Least Concern (IUCN 3.1)

Scientific classification
- Kingdom: Animalia
- Phylum: Chordata
- Class: Mammalia
- Order: Chiroptera
- Family: Phyllostomidae
- Genus: Micronycteris
- Species: M. minuta

Binomial name
- Micronycteris minuta Gervais, 1856

Species of bat

The white-bellied big-eared bat (Micronycteris minuta) is a bat species from South and Central America, as well as Trinidad and Tobago in the Caribbean.
