= Matses's big-eared bat =

Conservation status
- Data Deficient (IUCN 3.1)

Scientific classification
- Kingdom: Animalia
- Phylum: Chordata
- Class: Mammalia
- Order: Chiroptera
- Family: Phyllostomidae
- Genus: Micronycteris
- Species: M. matses

Binomial name
- Micronycteris matses Simmons, Voss & Fleck, 2002

Species of bat

Matses's big-eared bat (Micronycteris matses) is a bat species found in Peru.
