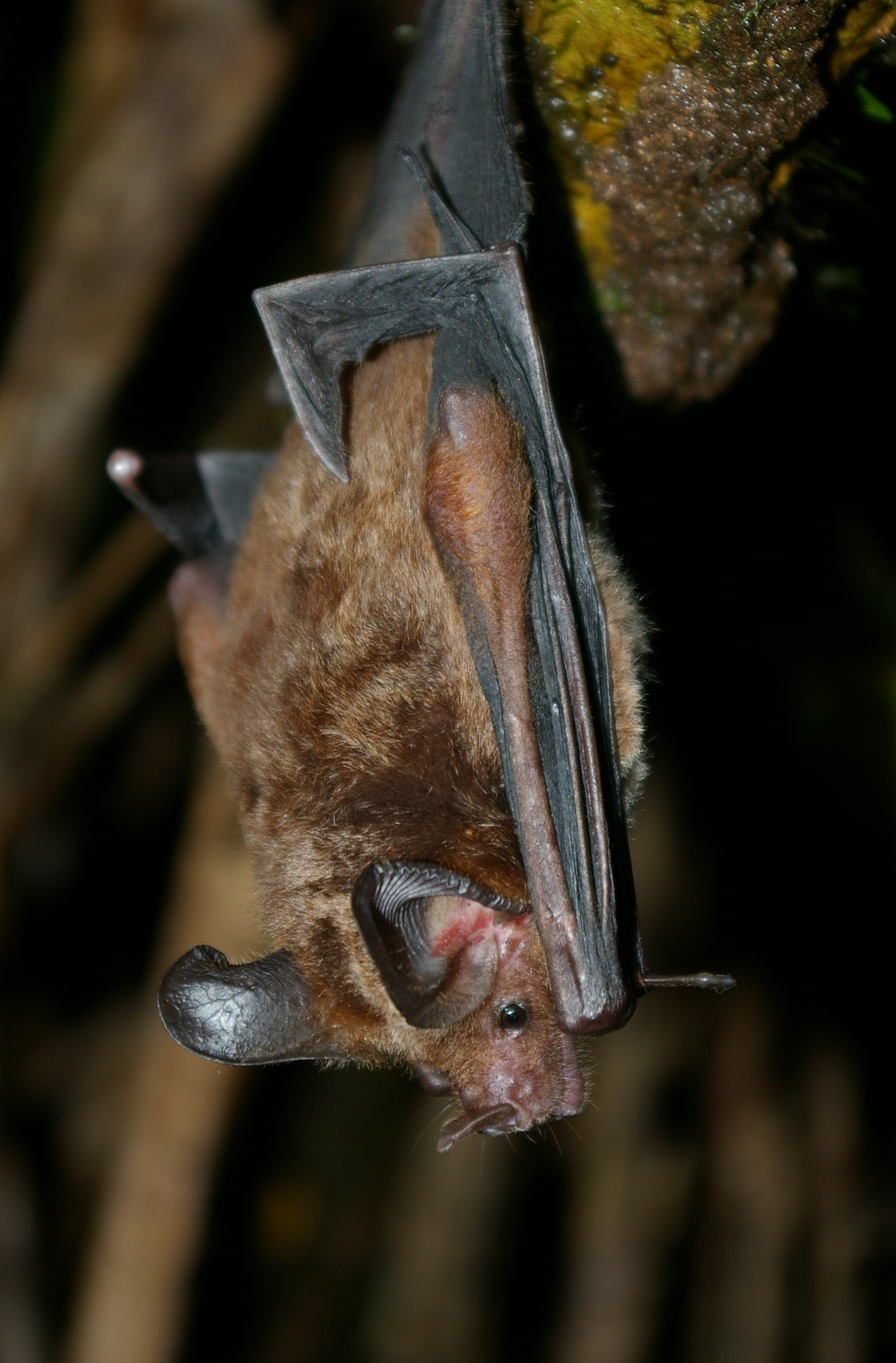
- Stripe-headed round-eared bat (Tonita saurophila)

Scientific classification
- Domain: Eukaryota
- Kingdom: Animalia
- Phylum: Chordata
- Class: Mammalia
- Order: Chiroptera
- Family: Phyllostomidae
- Subfamily: Phyllostominae
- Genus: Tonatia; Gray, 1827

Type species
- Vampyrus bidens Spix, 1823

= Tonatia =

Genus of bats

Tonatia is a small genus of South and Central American phyllostomid bats.

== Species ==
Greater round-eared bat, Tonatia bidens Spix, 1823
Stripe-headed round-eared bat, Tonatia saurophila Koopman & Williams, 1951
