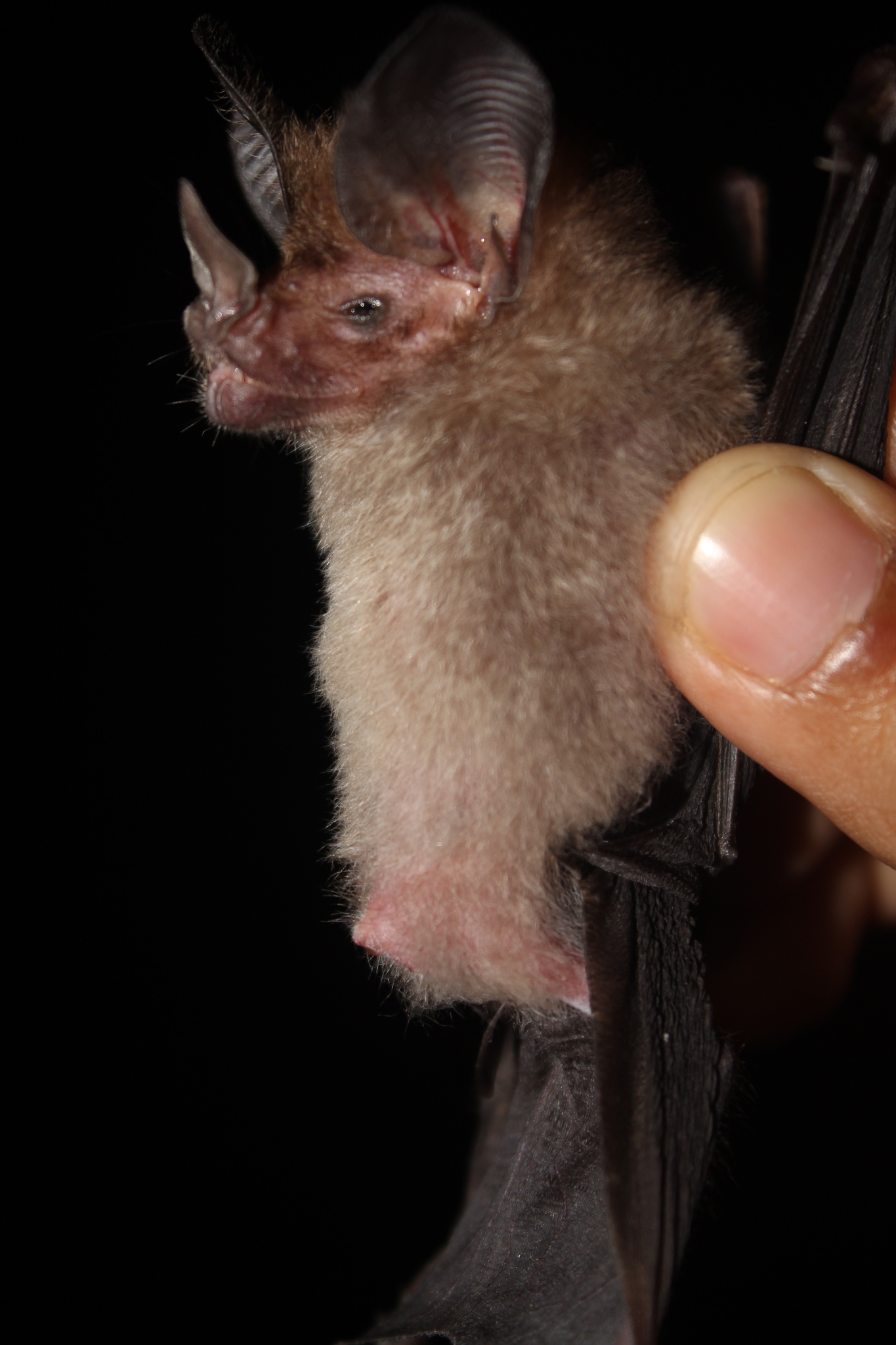

Conservation status
- Least Concern (IUCN 3.1)

Scientific classification
- Domain: Eukaryota
- Kingdom: Animalia
- Phylum: Chordata
- Class: Mammalia
- Order: Chiroptera
- Family: Phyllostomidae
- Genus: Micronycteris
- Species: M. hirsuta

Binomial name
- Micronycteris hirsuta Peters, 1869
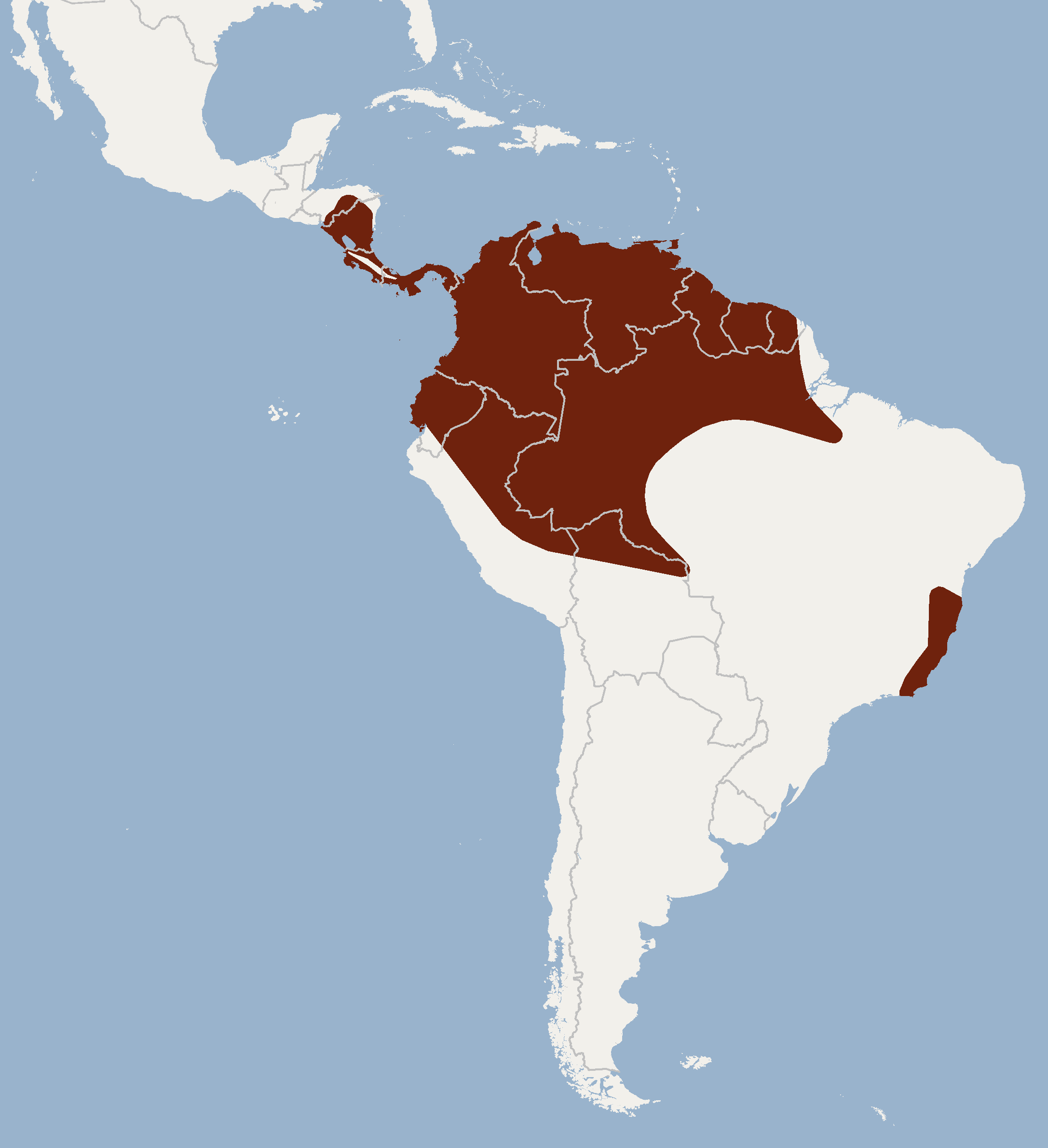

= Hairy big-eared bat =

Species of bat

The hairy big-eared bat (Micronycteris hirsuta) is a bat species from South and Central America, as well as Trinidad and Tobago in the Caribbean.
