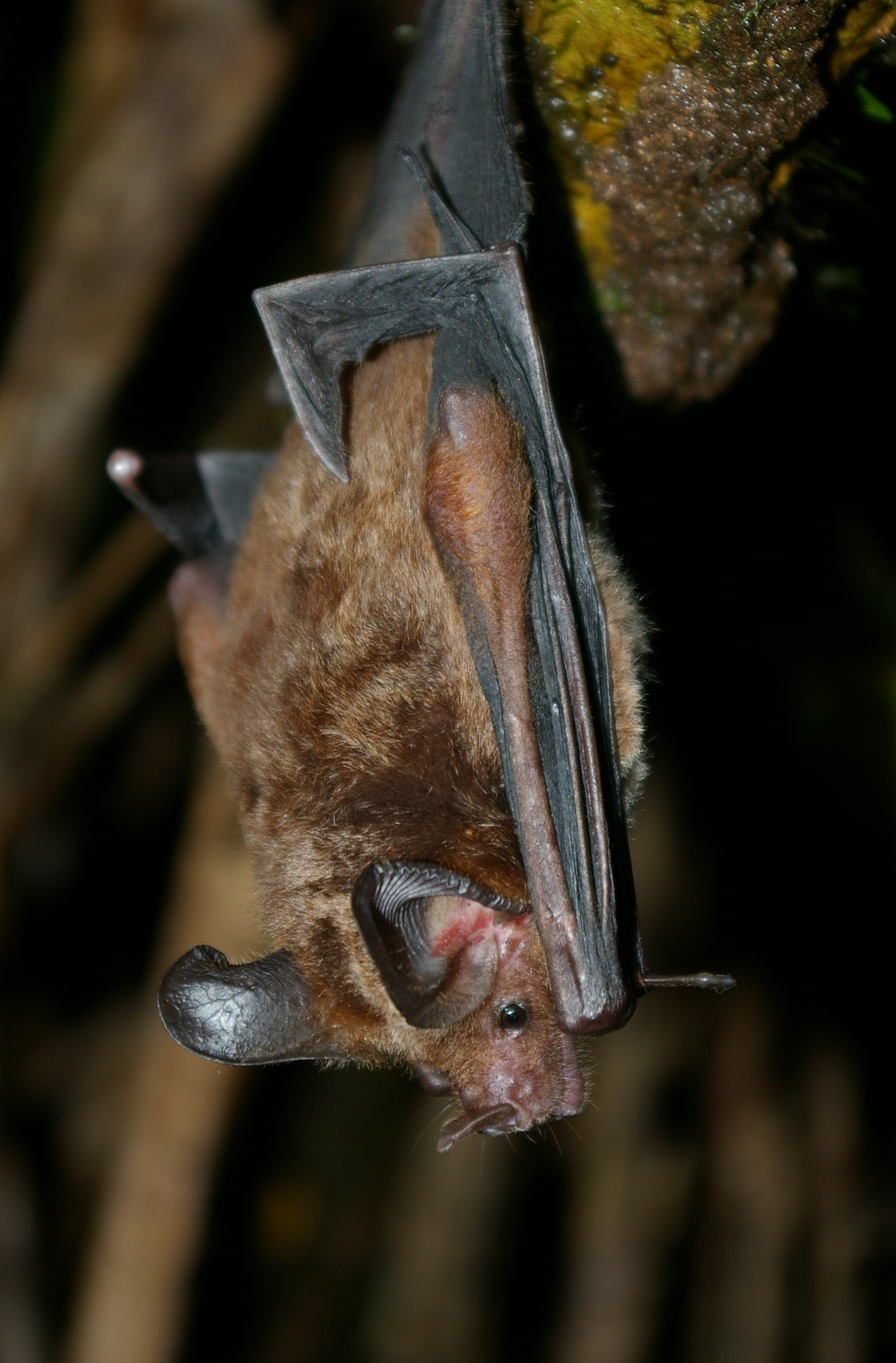

Conservation status
- Least Concern (IUCN 3.1)

Scientific classification
- Kingdom: Animalia
- Phylum: Chordata
- Class: Mammalia
- Order: Chiroptera
- Family: Phyllostomidae
- Genus: Tonatia
- Species: T. saurophila

Binomial name
- Tonatia saurophila Koopman & Williams, 1951

= Stripe-headed round-eared bat =

Species of bat

The stripe-headed round-eared bat (Tonatia saurophila) is a species of bat from family Phyllostomidae. It can be found on forests in Central and South America.
