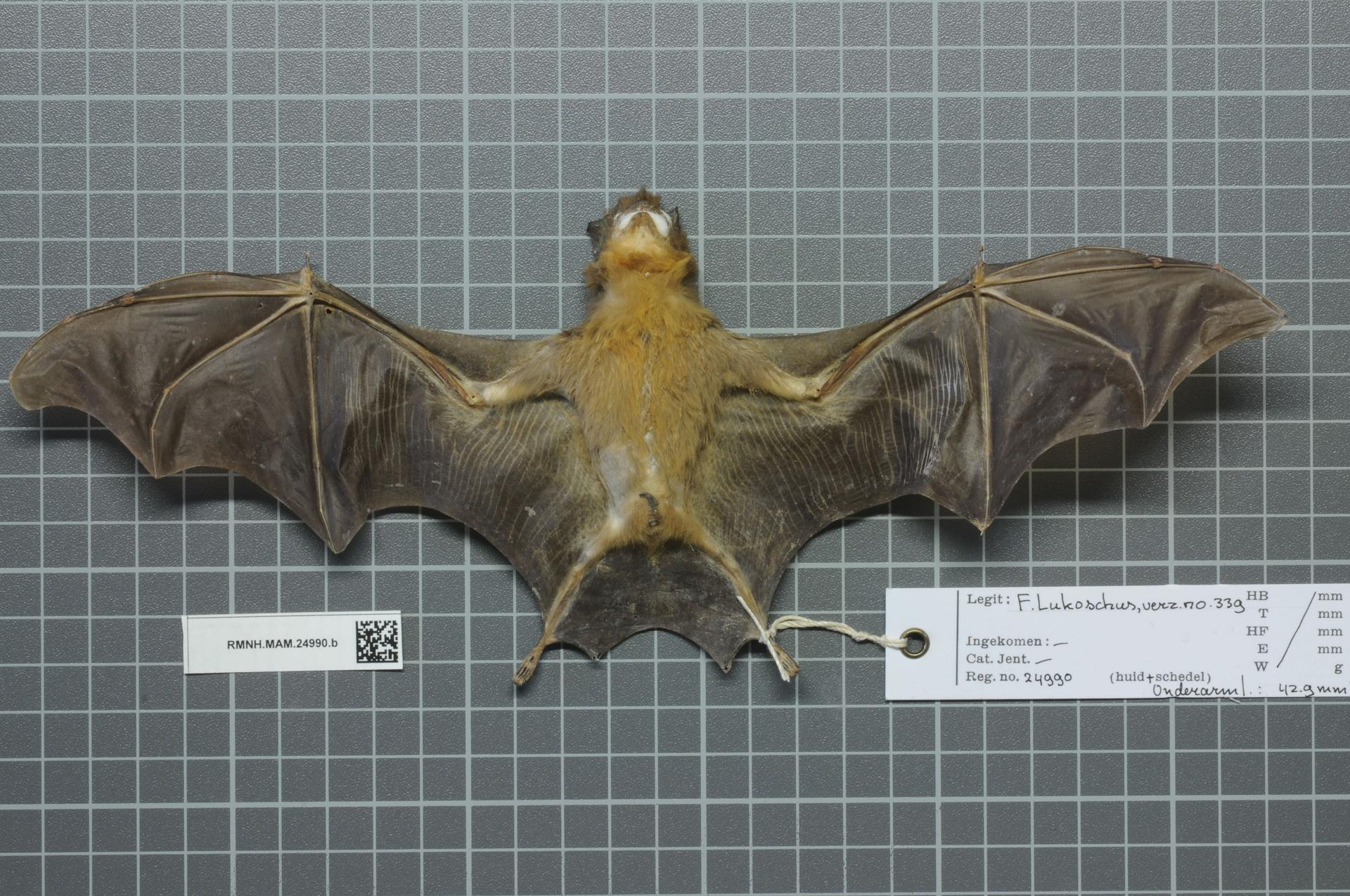

Conservation status
- Least Concern (IUCN 3.1)

Scientific classification
- Kingdom: Animalia
- Phylum: Chordata
- Class: Mammalia
- Order: Chiroptera
- Family: Phyllostomidae
- Subfamily: Micronycterinae
- Genus: Lampronycteris; Sanborn, 1949
- Species: L. brachyotis

Binomial name
- Lampronycteris brachyotis (Dobson, 1879)
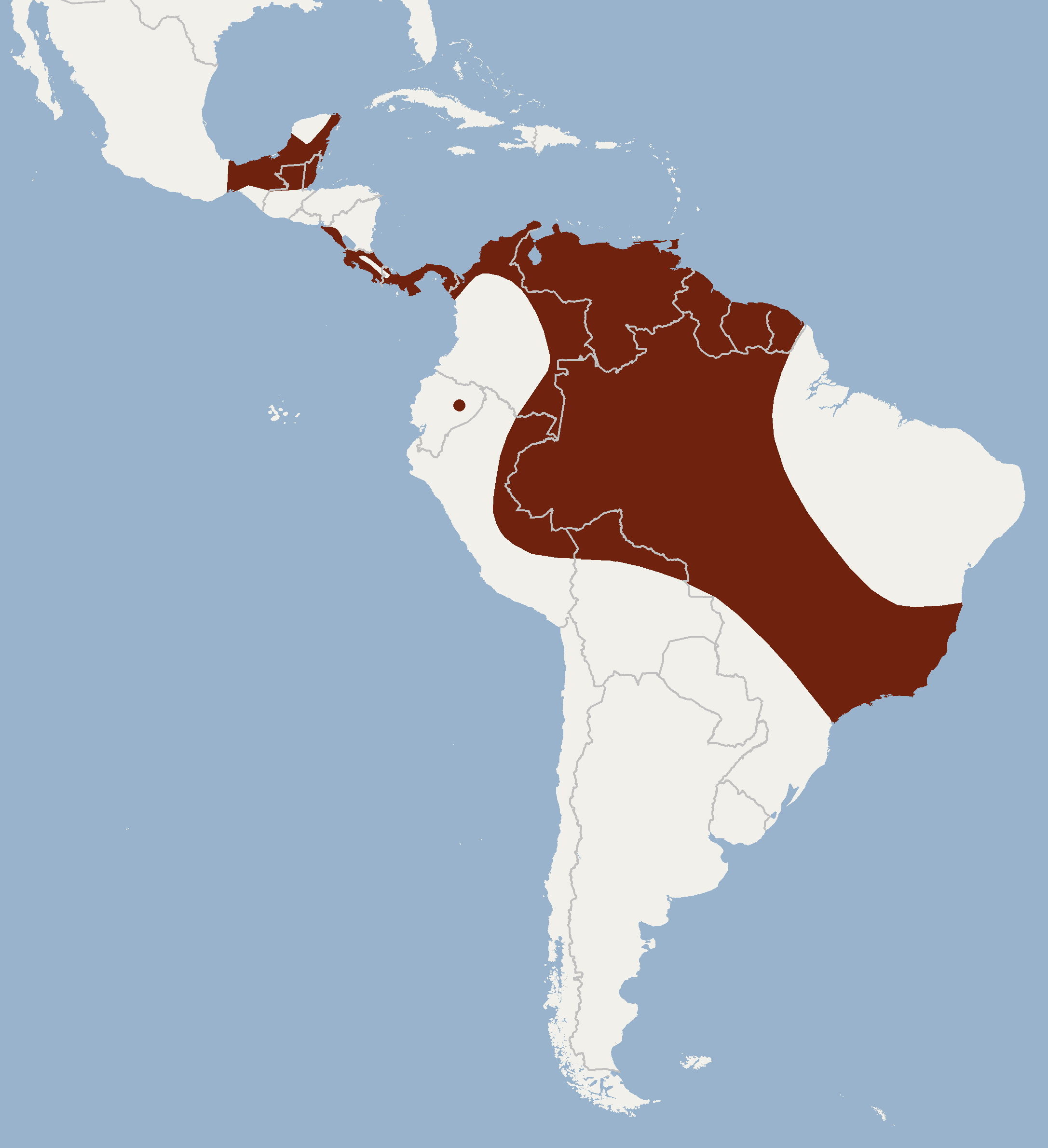

Synonyms
- Micronycteris brachyotis Dobson, 1879; Lampronycteris platyceps Sanborn, 1949

= Yellow-throated big-eared bat =

Species of bat

The yellow-throated big-eared bat or orange-throated bat(Lampronycteris brachyotis) is a species of bat that ranges from southern Mexico to Brazil. It is the only species within the genus Lampronycteris. A frugivore and insectivore, it is found in lowland forest up to an elevation of 700 m. Its activity is greatest in the first two hours after sunset, and peaks again after midnight.

== Description ==
The yellow-throated big-eared bat is characterized as a "medium-sized" leaf-nosed bat. Its ears are short and pointed, and its nose-leaf is relatively small. Its dorsal fur is dark brown or orange brown, and the ventral fur is orange or reddish-yellow. Individual bats weigh 9–15 g (0.32–0.53 oz) and have forearm lengths of 39–43 mm (1.5–1.7 in). The bat's dental formula is 2.1.2.32.1.3.3 for a total of 34 teeth.

== Biology and ecology ==
The yellow-throated big-eared bat is primarily an insectivore, but it will also consume fruit, nectar, and pollen. It is nocturnal, roosting in sheltered places during the day, such as caves, mines, hollow trees, and archaeological ruins. It generally roosts in small colonies consisting of 10 or fewer individuals, though a colony of 300 individuals was once documented in Mexico.

== Range and habitat ==
It is found in Belize, Brazil, Colombia, Costa Rica, French Guiana, Guatemala, Guyana, Mexico, Nicaragua, Panama, Peru, Suriname, Trinidad and Tobago, and Venezuela. It is generally found in lowland areas below 150 m (490 ft) above sea level, though it has been documented at up to 700 m (2,300 ft) above sea level.
