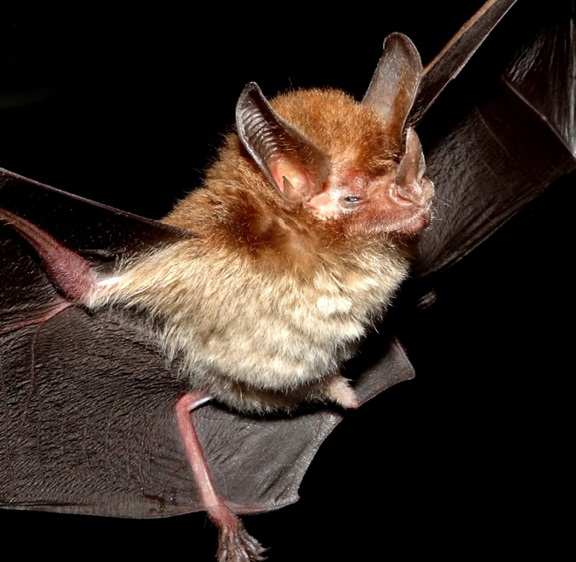

Conservation status
- Least Concern (IUCN 3.1)

Scientific classification
- Kingdom: Animalia
- Phylum: Chordata
- Class: Mammalia
- Order: Chiroptera
- Family: Phyllostomidae
- Genus: Micronycteris
- Species: M. schmidtorum

Binomial name
- Micronycteris schmidtorum Sanborn, 1935
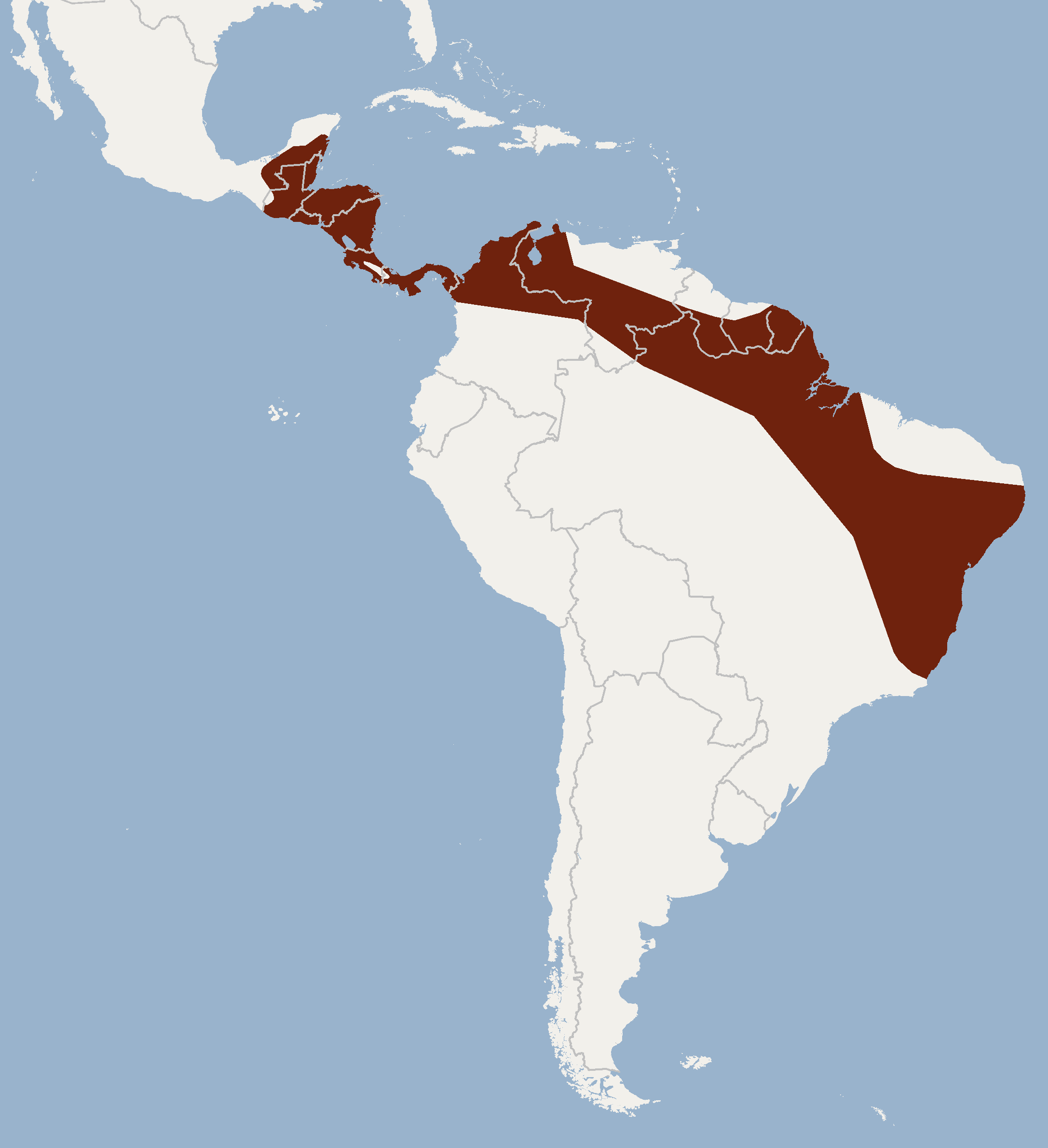

= Schmidts's big-eared bat =

Species of bat

Schmidts's big-eared bat (Micronycteris schmidtorum) is a bat species from South and Central America.

== Description ==
Individuals weigh 7–10 g (0.25–0.35 oz) and have forearm lengths of 33–36 mm (1.3–1.4 in). Its ears are long with rounded tips. Its dorsal fur is brown while its ventral fur light gray or whitish. Its dental formula is 2.1.2.32.1.3.3 for a total of 34 teeth.

== Biology and ecology ==
It is insectivorous, though it possibly also consumes fruit. It is nocturnal, roosting in sheltered places during the day such as hollow trees or in human structures.

== Range and habitat ==
It is found in Belize, Bolivia, Brazil, Colombia Costa Rica, El Salvador, French Guiana, Guatemala, Honduras, Mexico, Nicaragua, Panama, Peru, and Venezuela. It is generally documented in lowland areas.

== Conservation ==
As of 2016, it is assessed as a least-concern species by the IUCN.
