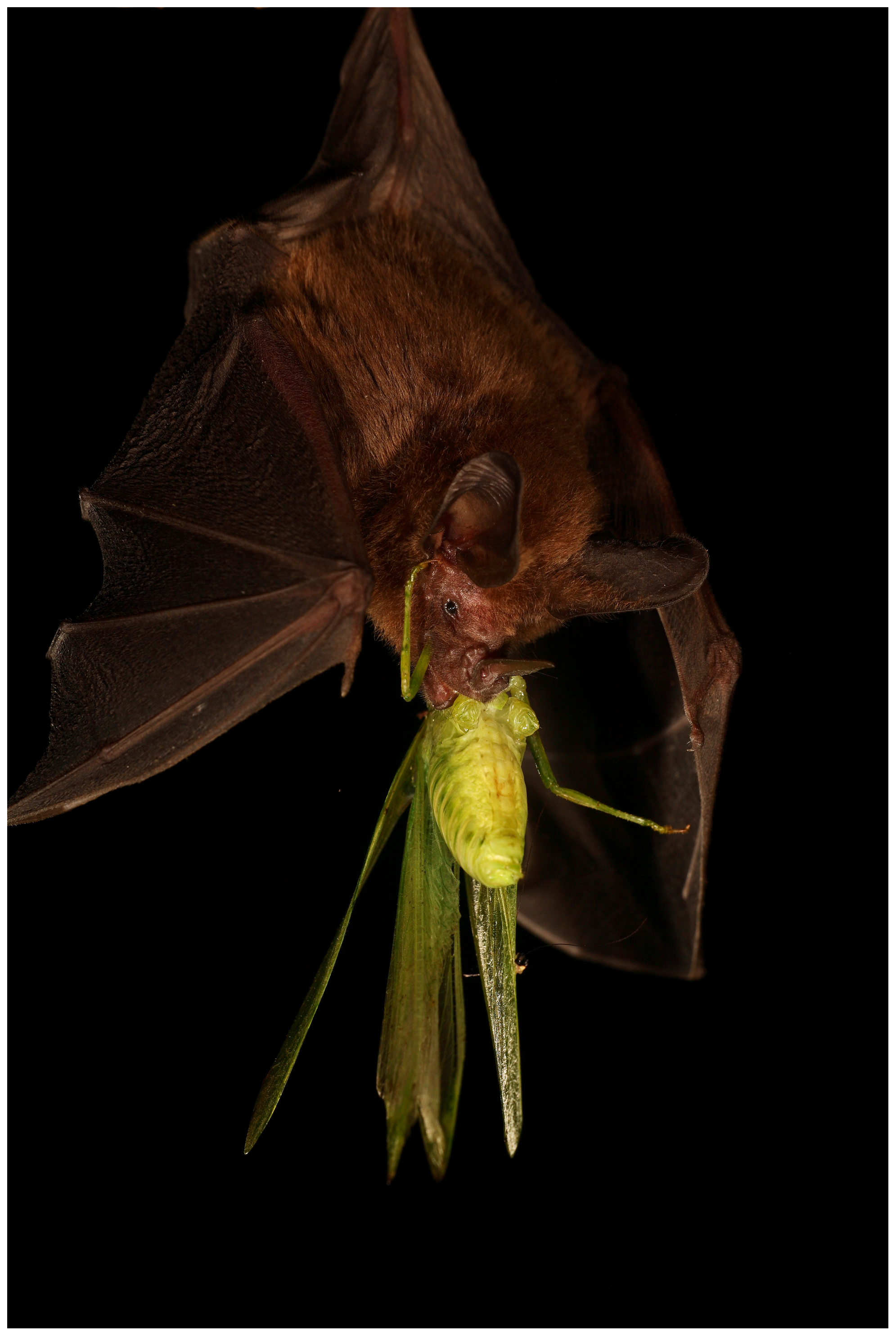
- Common big-eared bat (Micronycteris microtis)

Scientific classification
- Kingdom: Animalia
- Phylum: Chordata
- Class: Mammalia
- Infraclass: Placentalia
- Order: Chiroptera
- Family: Phyllostomidae
- Subfamily: Micronycterinae
- Genus: Micronycteris; Gray, 1866

Type species
- Phyllophora megalotis Gray, 1842

Species
- Micronycteris brosseti Micronycteris buriri Micronycteris giovanniae Micronycteris hirsuta Micronycteris homezi Micronycteris matses Micronycteris megalotis Micronycteris microtis Micronycteris minuta Micronycteris sanborni Micronycteris schmidtorum Micronycteris yatesi

= Micronycteris =

Genus of bats

Micronycteris is a genus of leaf-nosed bats.

== List of species ==
Genus Micronycteris - little big-eared bats

- Brosset's big-eared bat, Micronycteris brosseti Simmons & Voss, 1998
- Saint Vincent big-eared bat, Micronycteris buriri Larsen, Siles, Pedersen, & Kwiecinski, 2011
- Micronycteris giovanniae Baker & Fonseca, 2007
- Hairy big-eared bat, Micronycteris hirsuta (Peters, 1869)
- Matses's big-eared bat, Micronycteris matses Simmons, Voss, & Fleck, 2002
- Little big-eared bat, Micronycteris megalotis (Gray, 1842)
- Common big-eared bat, Micronycteris microtis Miller, 1898
- White-bellied big-eared bat, Micronycteris minuta (Gervais, 1855)
- Sanborn's big-eared bat, Micronycteris sanborni Simmons, 1996
- Schmidts's big-eared bat, Micronycteris schmidtorum Sanborn, 1935
- Yates's big-eared bat, Micronycteris yatesi Siles & Brooks, 2013
