= Nancy Simmons =

American zoologist

Nancy B. Simmons
- Education: Pomona College, University of California, Berkeley
- Employer(s): American Museum of Natural History, Richard Gilder Graduate School
- Known for: Study of the biology of bats

Nancy B. Simmons is an American zoologist, mammalogist, professor, and author. Specializing in bats, Simmons has conducted extensive research on the morphology and evolutionary history of numerous bat species. She is also the curator-in-charge of the Department of Mammalogy at the American Museum of Natural History and a professor at the Richard Gilder Graduate School.

== Education ==
Simmons graduated cum laude from Pomona College in 1981. She then earned her Ph.D. from the University of California, Berkeley in 1989.

== Teaching ==
Simmons began working as a teaching assistant for the University of California, Berkeley in 1986. She went on to become an instructor of paleontology in 1987 and a zoology lecturer in 1988.

== American Museum of Natural History ==
In addition to research, Simmons works closely with the American Museum of Natural History (AMNH). Ever since she began as a Kalbfleisch/Hoffman Postdoctoral Research Fellow at the AMNH in 1989, Simmons has conducted research for the museum as a faculty member. She is currently the Curator-in-Charge, Department of Mammalogy, Division of Vertebrate Zoology. Simmons is also a professor at the Richard Gilder Graduate School, a Ph.D. program in comparative biology offered by the American Museum of Natural History.

== Research ==
Simmons' research is primarily focused on the phylogeny of bats. Using both morphological data and DNA sequence data, Simmons has conducted numerous studies that shed light on the relationships not only between different bat species, but between the Chiroptera clade and other clades. Using living and fossilized specimen, she studies bat behavior, diet, mechanisms of flight, and echolocation, applying her knowledge of phylogeny to explain certain phenomena. Her extensive field work in Central America, South America, and Southeast Asia has led her to discover several species of bats, such as Sanborn's big-eared bat. In 2021, she was part of a team of scientists who discovered a new West African bat, Myotis nimbaensis.

Her findings contribute to constructing large-scale phylogenetic trees. Simmons and her team have submitted numerous evolutionary data surrounding bats and other animal clades to Morphobank, an archive of evolutionary research. Furthermore, Simmons' team has also worked on the project Assembling the Tree of Life, where numerous organizations worked to piece together mammalian phylogeny through morphology.

== MorphoBank ==
Simmons' evolutionary data has contributed to MorphoBank's database of morphological features, submitting hundreds of morphological characteristics of Chiroptera species in order to conduct genetic testing to create an accurate phylogenetic tree. Simmons has also accessed MorphoBank as the curator for the American Museum of Natural History to engage in outreach work. In 2013, Simmons worked as part of the Morpholution program to help high school students engage in state-of-the-art digital analysis tools provided by MorphoBank to examine evolutionary relationships.

== Publications ==
Simmons has been cited on 141 publications regarding bat phylogeny including:

- Gunnell, G., N. B. Simmons, and E. R. Seiffert. 2014. Myzopodidae (Chiroptera) from the Late Paleogene of Egypt: Emended family diagnosis and biogeographic origins of Noctilionoidea. PLoS ONE 9(2): e86712.
- Velazco, P. M., R. Gregorin, R. S. Voss, and N. B. Simmons. 2014. Extraordinary local diversity of Disk-winged bats (Thyropteridae: Thyroptera) in northeastern Peru, with the description of a new species and comments on roosting behavior. American Museum Novitates 379: 1-28.
- Olival, K. J., C. W. Dick, N. B. Simmons, J. C. Morales, D. Melnkck, K. Dittmar, S, L, Perkins, P. Daszak, and R. Desalle. 2013. Lack of population genetic structure and host specificity in the bat fly, Cyclopodia horsfeldi, across species of Pteropus bats in Southeast Asia. Parasites and Vectors, 6: 231 (18 pp).
- Burleigh, G., K. Alphonse, A. J. Alverson, H. M. Bik, C. Blank, A. L. Cirranello, H. Cui, M. Daly, T. G. Dietterich, G. Gasparich, J. Irvine, M. Julius, S. Kaufman, E. Law, J. Liu, L. Moore, M. A. O'Leary, M. Passarotti, S. Ranade, N. B. Simmons, D. W. Stevenson, R. W. Thacker, E. C. Theriot, S. Todorovic, P. M. Velazco, R. L. Walls, J. M. Wolfe, and M. Yu. Next-generation phenomics for the Tree of Life. PLOS Currents Tree of Life, 2013.

== Awards and recognition ==
In 1986, Simmons was named by the Society of Vertebrate Paleontology as an honorable mention for the Romer Prize, and then was awarded the Romer Prize in 1988. In 1989, Simmons was awarded with the Outstanding Graduate Student Instructor Award by the University of California. In 2008, Simmons was awarded the Gerrit S. Miller Award from the North American Society for Bat Research.
