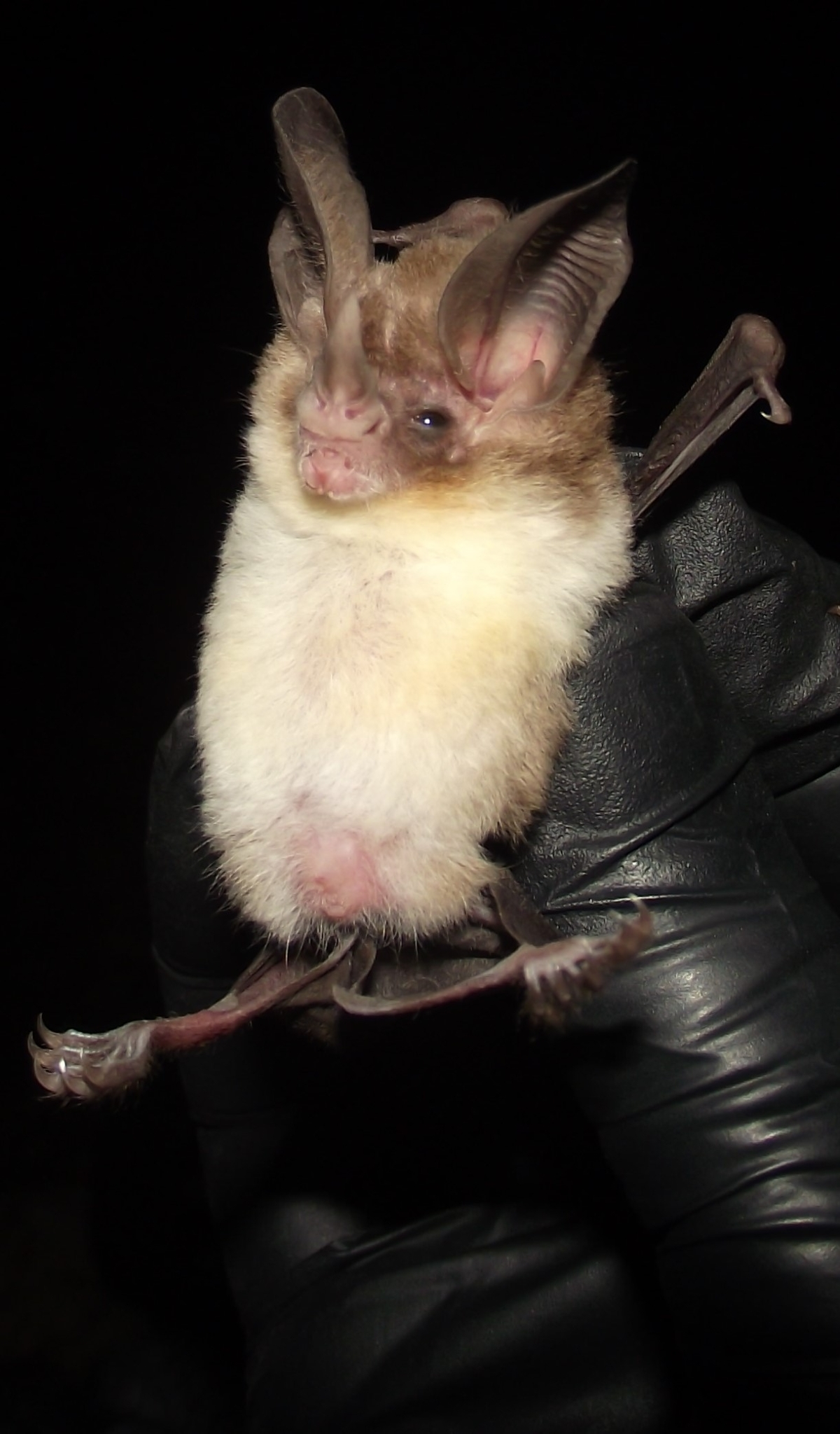

Conservation status
- Least Concern (IUCN 3.1)

Scientific classification
- Kingdom: Animalia
- Phylum: Chordata
- Class: Mammalia
- Order: Chiroptera
- Family: Phyllostomidae
- Genus: Micronycteris
- Species: M. sanborni

Binomial name
- Micronycteris sanborni Simmons, 1996
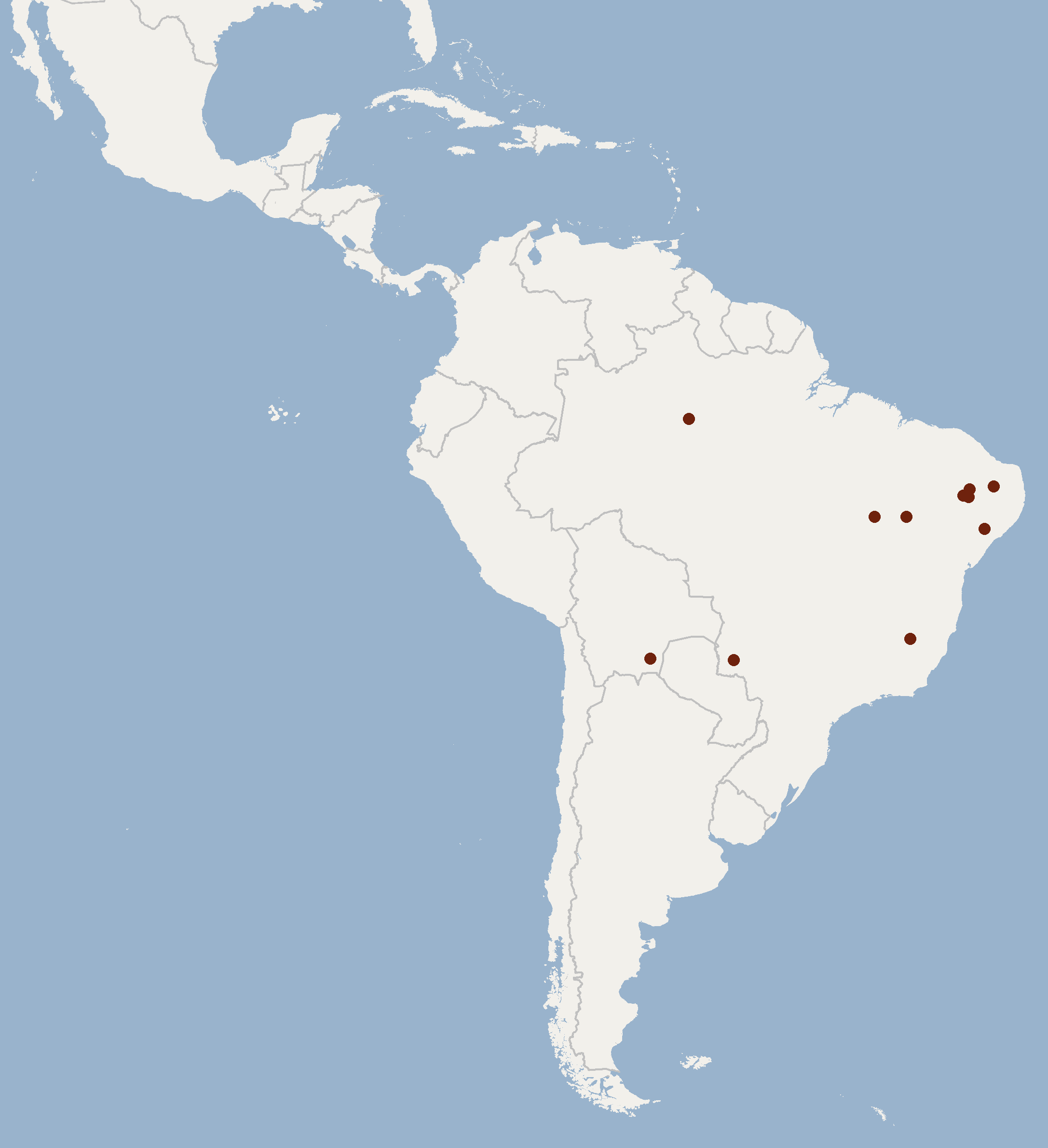

= Sanborn's big-eared bat =

Species of bat

Sanborn's big-eared bat (Micronycteris sanborni) is a bat species found in Bolivia and Brazil.
