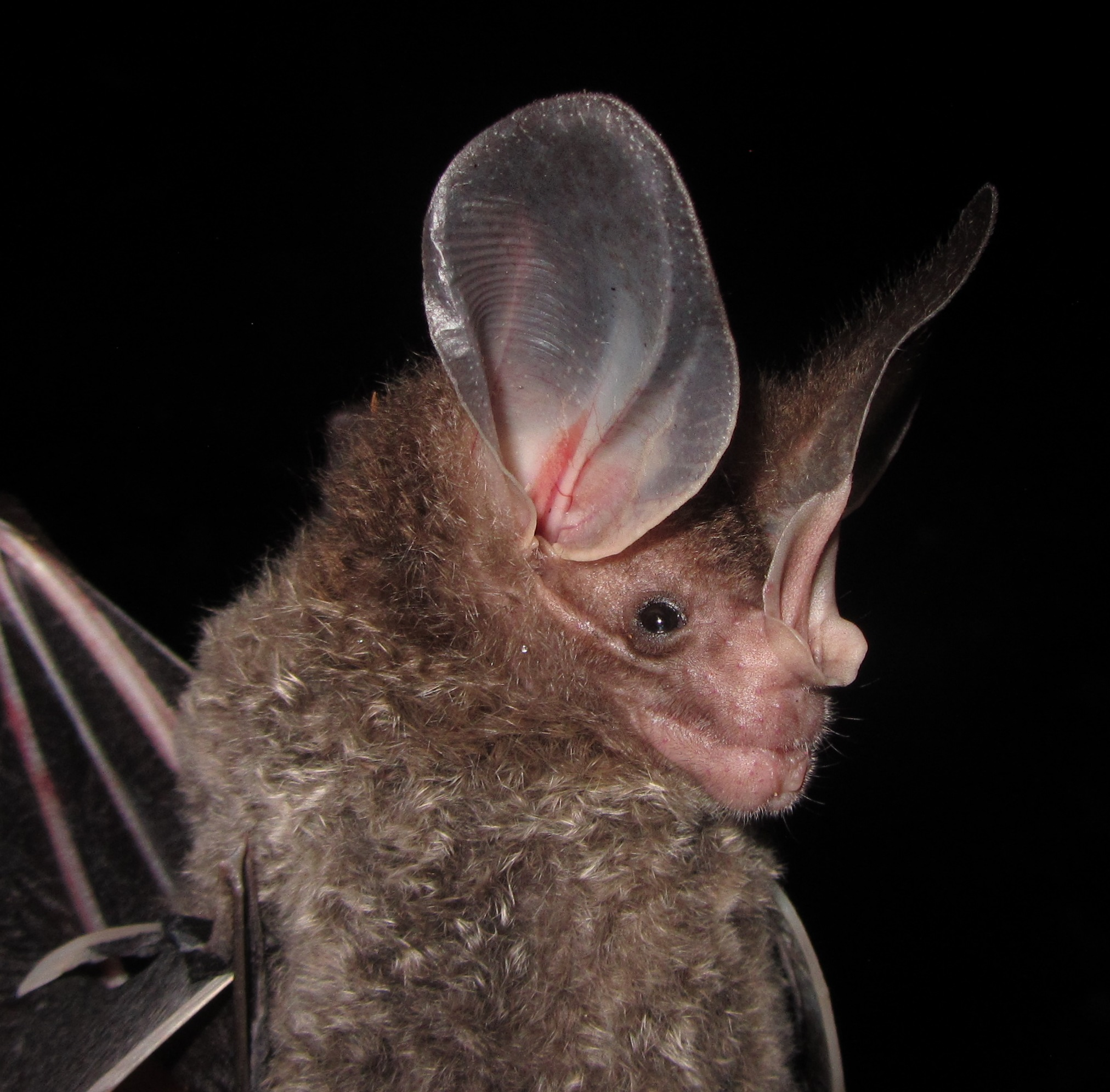

Conservation status
- Least Concern (IUCN 3.1)

Scientific classification
- Kingdom: Animalia
- Phylum: Chordata
- Class: Mammalia
- Order: Chiroptera
- Family: Phyllostomidae
- Genus: Chrotopterus; Peters, 1865
- Species: C. auritus

Binomial name
- Chrotopterus auritus Peters, 1865
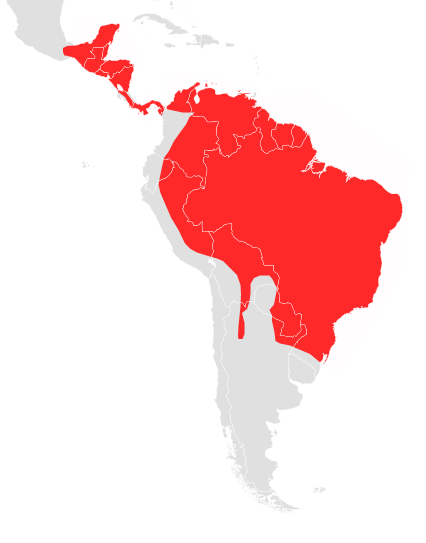
- Big-eared woolly bat range

= Big-eared woolly bat =

Species of mammals belonging to the New World leaf-nosed bat family

The big-eared woolly bat or (Peters's) woolly false vampire bat (Chrotopterus auritus) is a species of bat, belonging to the family Phyllostomidae.

The name Chrotopterus is derived from Greek roots chariots (skin, color), and pteron (wing). The epithet auritus refers to the large ears.

== Description ==
Big-eared woolly bats are very large predatory bats, the second largest bat species in the neotropics. Their body mass typically ranges from 75 to 96 grams (2.6 to 3.4 oz). The length of the forearm ranges from 79 to 83 millimetres (3.1 to 3.3 in). There are only three New World phyllostomid bats of comparable size. The dorsal hair is about 12 millimetres (0.47 in) long, which is longer than that most of phyllostomid species. They also possess two lower incisors, a trait typically shared with smaller bats.

== Ecology ==
=== Habitat ===
Big woolly-eared bats live in warm subtropical forests, usually roosting in caves and hollow logs, where prey is returned to before consumption. Geographically, they are found in southern parts of Mexico and extend through Northeastern South America, being found as far south as northern Argentina. They are typically found in areas that also host many other species of bat.

=== Diet ===
Big-eared woolly bats have diverse feeding habits. It has been shown to feed primarily on small arthropods and small vertebrates, including beetles, moths, small mammals (including opossums and rodents), birds (including passerine birds) and even other bat species. Though primarily carnivorous or insectivorous, it has also been known to eat fruit. However, in captivity, they refused to eat fruit, indicating a preference toward meat or insects. Another unique prey item for this species are geckos. This prey item was previously thought to have been only displayed in one other species of New World bat - T. cirrhosis. They are able to take prey of up to 70 grams (2.5 oz) weight, but more commonly feed on smaller vertebrates of 10 to 35 grams (0.35 to 1.23 oz). Prey is not consumed until the bat has returned to its roost and returned to its head-down position.

== Behavior ==
Big-eared woolly bats fly slowly, partially because of their large size, flying 1 or 2 meters above ground and usually in dense thickets. They are typically either solitary or part of a small group. Colony sizes vary between one and seven individuals, consisting of a male-female adult pair and their pup(s).

== Reproduction ==
Big-eared woolly bats give birth to a single young per reproduction cycle, after a gestation period of more than 100 days. This is the largest parental investment exhibited in a species belonging to the Phyllostomid family. Newborn pups are born roughly 32.5% of the size of the mother, whereas other species in the Phyllostomid family range from 18.6-29.4% of mother size.
