= List of mammals of Brazil =

Brazil has the largest mammal diversity in the world, with around 751 described species and more likely to be discovered. According to the International Union for Conservation of Nature, 66 of these species are endangered, and 40% of the threatened taxa belong to the primate group.

The following tags are used to highlight each species' conservation status as assessed by the International Union for Conservation of Nature:

EX	Extinct	No reasonable doubt that the last individual has died.
EW	Extinct in the wild	Known only to survive in captivity or as a naturalized populations well outside its previous range.
CR	Critically endangered	The species is in imminent risk of extinction in the wild.
EN	Endangered	The species is facing an extremely high risk of extinction in the wild.
VU	Vulnerable	The species is facing a high risk of extinction in the wild.
NT	Near threatened	The species does not meet any of the criteria that would categorise it as risking extinction but it is likely to do so in the future.
LC	Least concern	There are no current identifiable risks to the species.
DD	Data deficient	There is inadequate information to make an assessment of the risks to this species.

Some species were assessed using an earlier set of criteria. Species assessed using this system have the following instead of least concern categories:

LR/lc	Lower risk/least concern	Species for which there are no identifiable risks.

== Infraclass: Metatheria ==
=== Order: Didelphimorphia ===
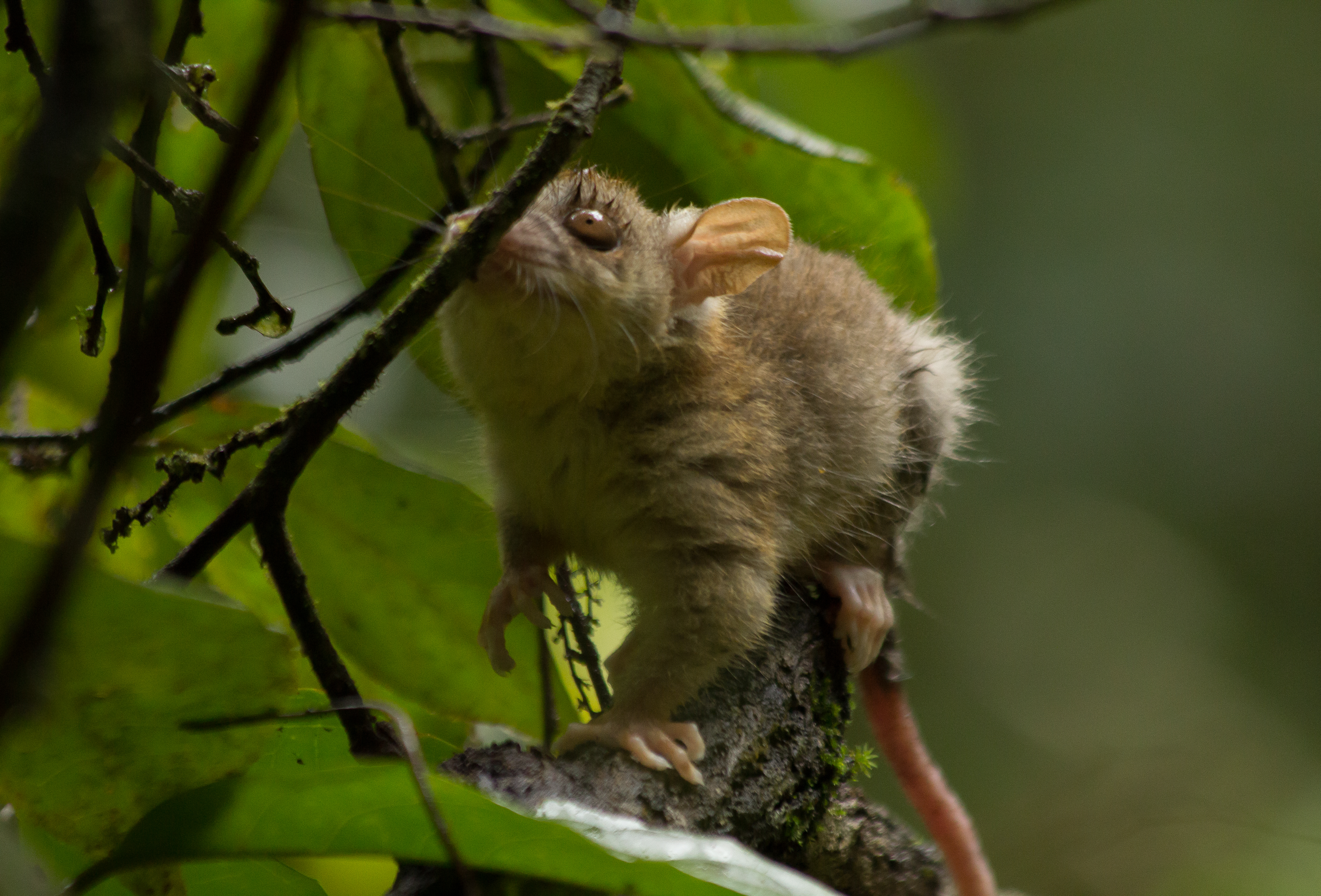
Bare-tailed woolly opossum

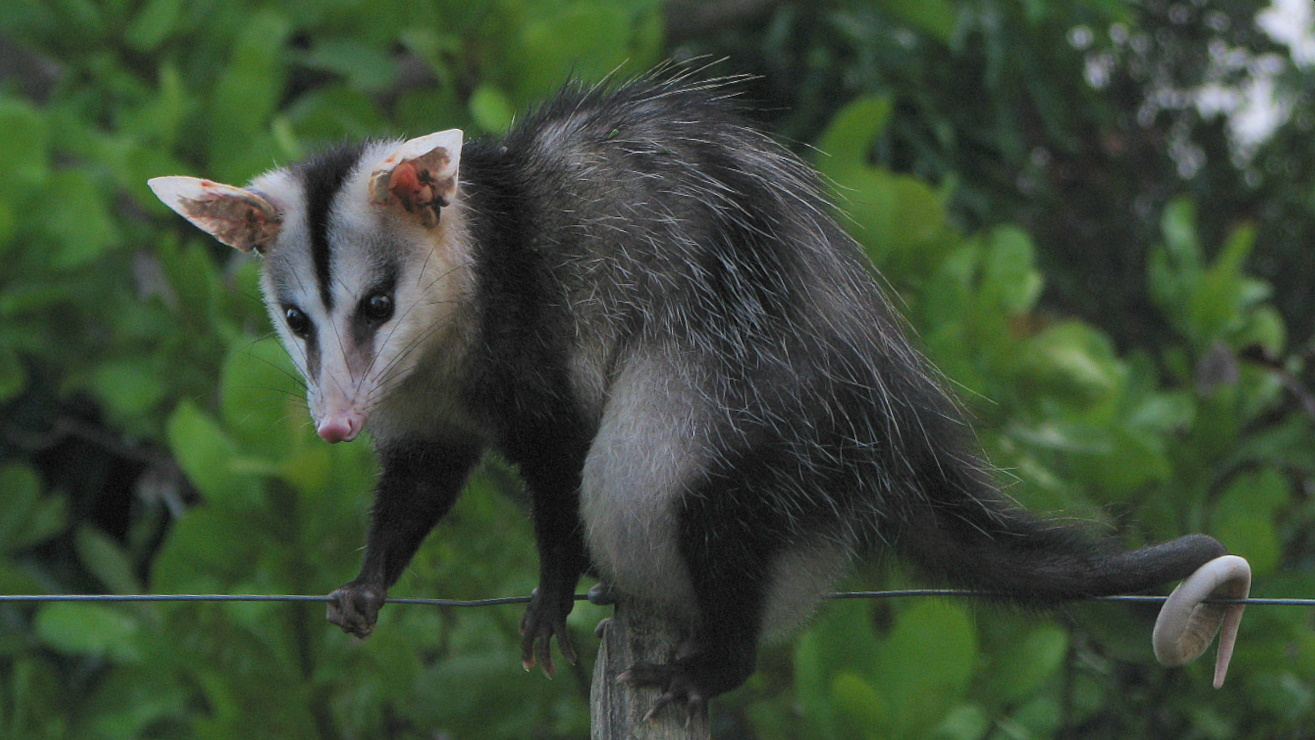
White-eared opossum

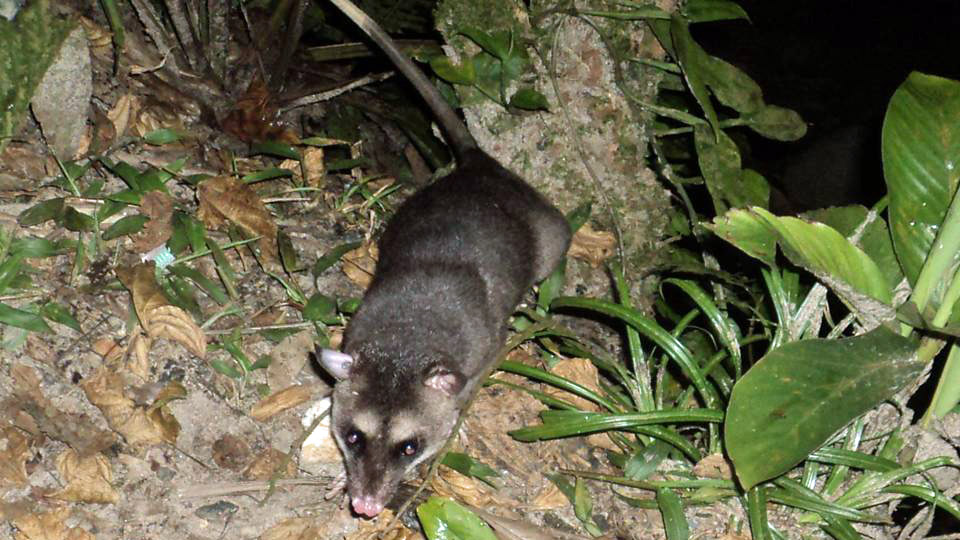
Gray four-eyed opossum

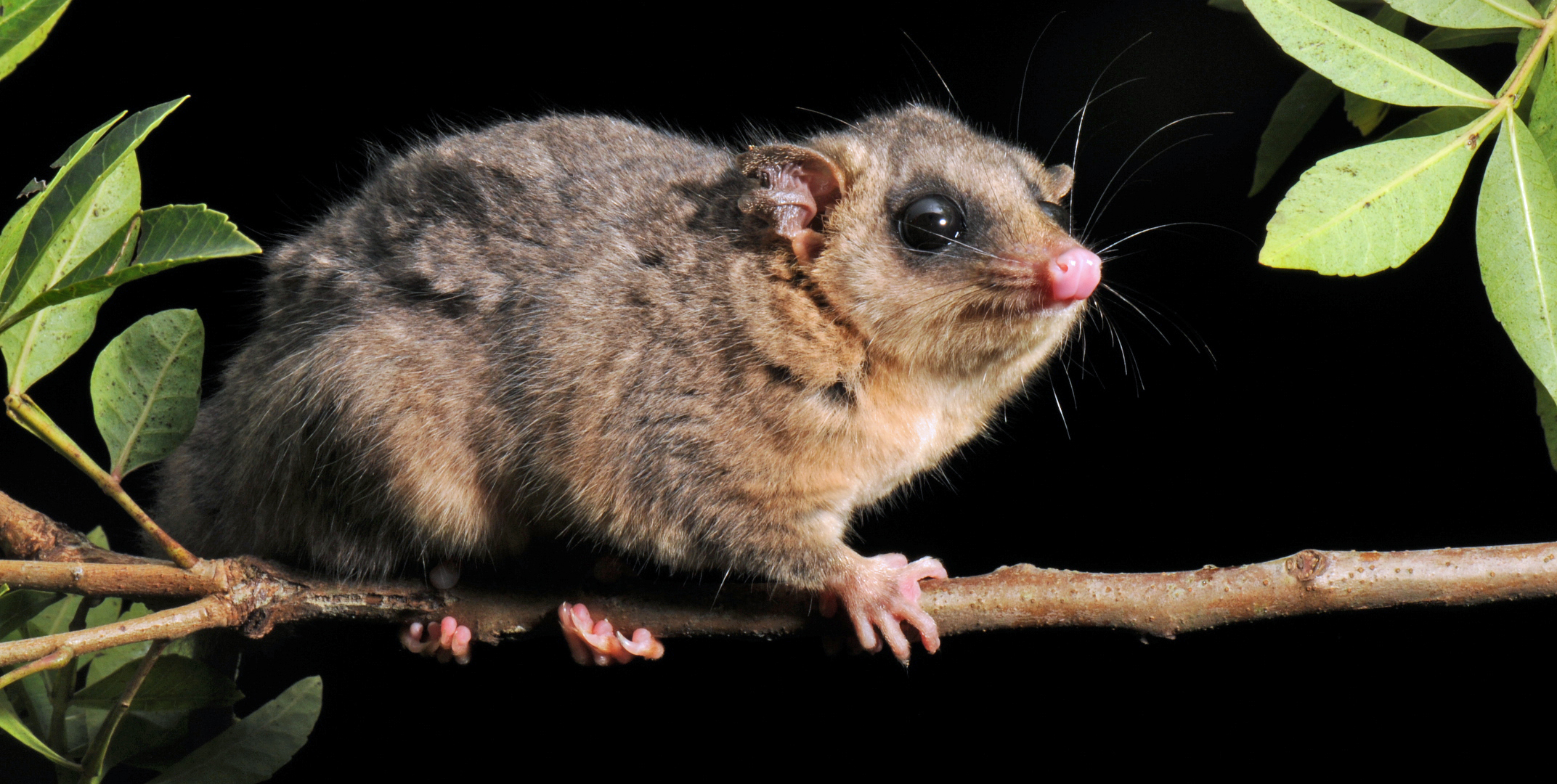
Tate's woolly mouse opossum

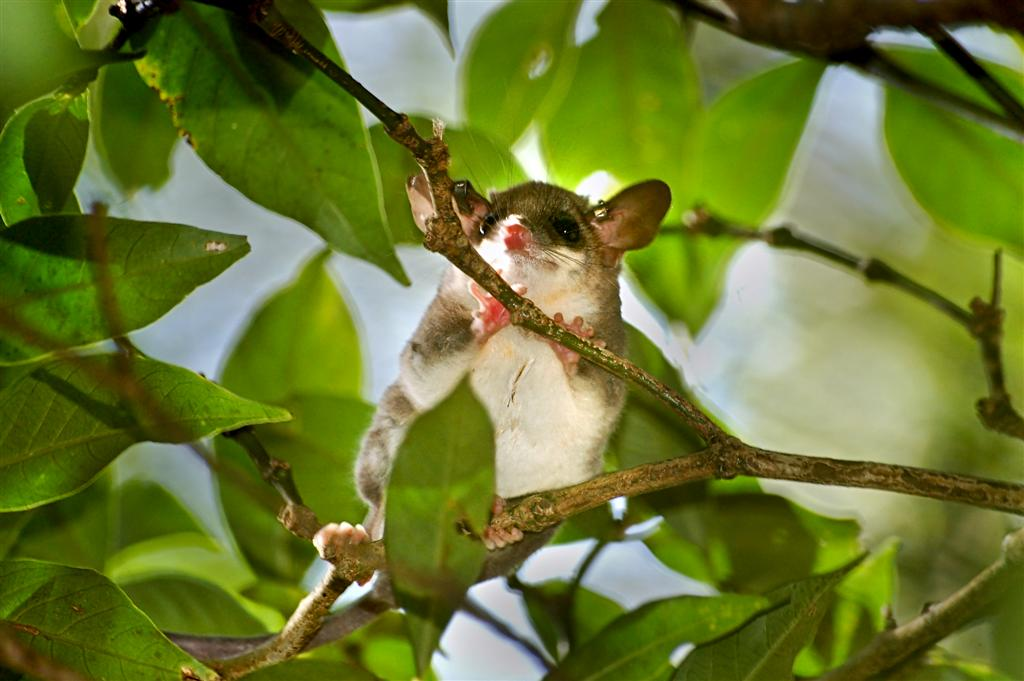
Gray slender opossum

- Family: Caluromyidae
  - Genus: Caluromys
    - Brown-eared woolly opossum, C. lanatus LC
    - Bare-tailed woolly opossum, C. philander LC
- Family: Didelphidae
  - Genus: Caluromysiops
    - Black-shouldered opossum, Caluromysiops irrupta LC
  - Genus: Glironia
    - Bushy-tailed opossum, Glironia venusta LC
  - Genus: Chironectes
    - Water opossum, Chironectes minimus LC
  - Genus: Didelphis
    - White-eared opossum, Didelphis albiventris LC
    - Big-eared opossum, Didelphis aurita LC
    - Guianan white-eared opossum, Didelphis imperfecta LC
  - Genus: Lutreolina
    - Big lutrine opossum, Lutreolina crassicaudata LC
  - Genus: Philander
    - Anderson's four-eyed opossum, Philander andersoni LC
    - Southeastern four-eyed opossum, Philander frenatus LC
    - McIlhenny's four-eyed opossum, Philander mcilhennyi LC
    - Gray four-eyed opossum, Philander opossum LC
  - Genus: Gracilinanus
    - Agile gracile opossum, Gracilinanus agilis LC
    - Emilia's gracile opossum, Gracilinanus emiliae DD
    - Brazilian gracile opossum, Gracilinanus microtarsus LC
  - Genus: Marmosa
    - White-bellied woolly mouse opossum, Marmosa constantiae LC
    - Woolly mouse opossum, Marmosa demerarae LC
    - Rufous mouse opossum, Marmosa lepida LC
    - Linnaeus's mouse opossum, Marmosa murina LC
    - Tate's woolly mouse opossum, Marmosa paraguayana LC
    - Bare-tailed woolly mouse opossum, Marmosa regina LC
  - Genus: Marmosops
    - Tschudi's slender opossum, Marmosops impavidus LC
    - Gray slender opossum, Marmosops incanus LC
    - Neblina slender opossum, Marmosops neblina LC
    - White-bellied slender mouse opossum, Marmosops noctivagus LC
    - Delicate slender opossum, Marmosops parvidens LC
    - Brazilian slender opossum, Marmosops paulensis LC
    - Pinheiro's slender opossum, Marmosops pinheiroi LC
  - Genus: Metachirus
    - Brown four-eyed opossum, Metachirus nudicaudatus LC
  - Genus: Monodelphis
    - Northern three-striped opossum, Monodelphis americana LC
    - Northern red-sided opossum, Monodelphis brevicaudata LC
    - Yellow-sided opossum, Monodelphis dimidiata LC
    - Gray short-tailed opossum, Monodelphis domestica LC
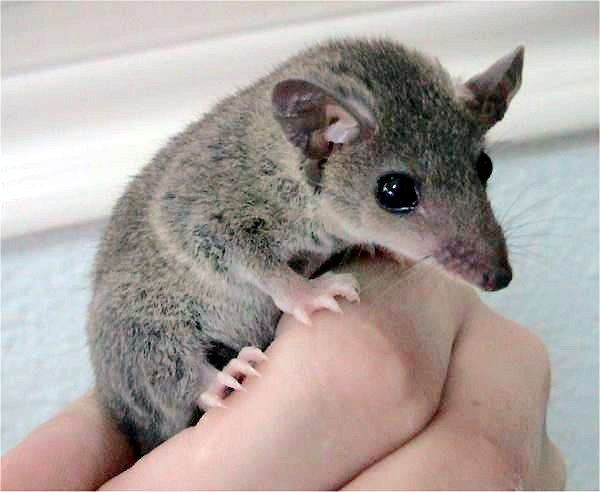
      Gray short-tailed opossum
    - Emilia's short-tailed opossum, Monodelphis emiliae LC
    - Ihering's three-striped opossum, Monodelphis iheringi DD
    - Pygmy short-tailed opossum, Monodelphis kunsi LC
    - Marajó short-tailed opossum, Monodelphis maraxina DD
    - Chestnut-striped opossum, Monodelphis rubida DD
    - Long-nosed short-tailed opossum, Monodelphis scalops LC
    - Southern red-sided opossum, Monodelphis sorex LC
    - Southern three-striped opossum, Monodelphis theresa DD
    - Red three-striped opossum, Monodelphis umbristriata VU
    - One-striped opossum, Monodelphis unistriata CR
  - Genus: Thylamys
    - Dwarf fat-tailed mouse opossum, Thylamys velutinus LC

== Infraclass: Eutheria ==
=== Order: Pilosa ===
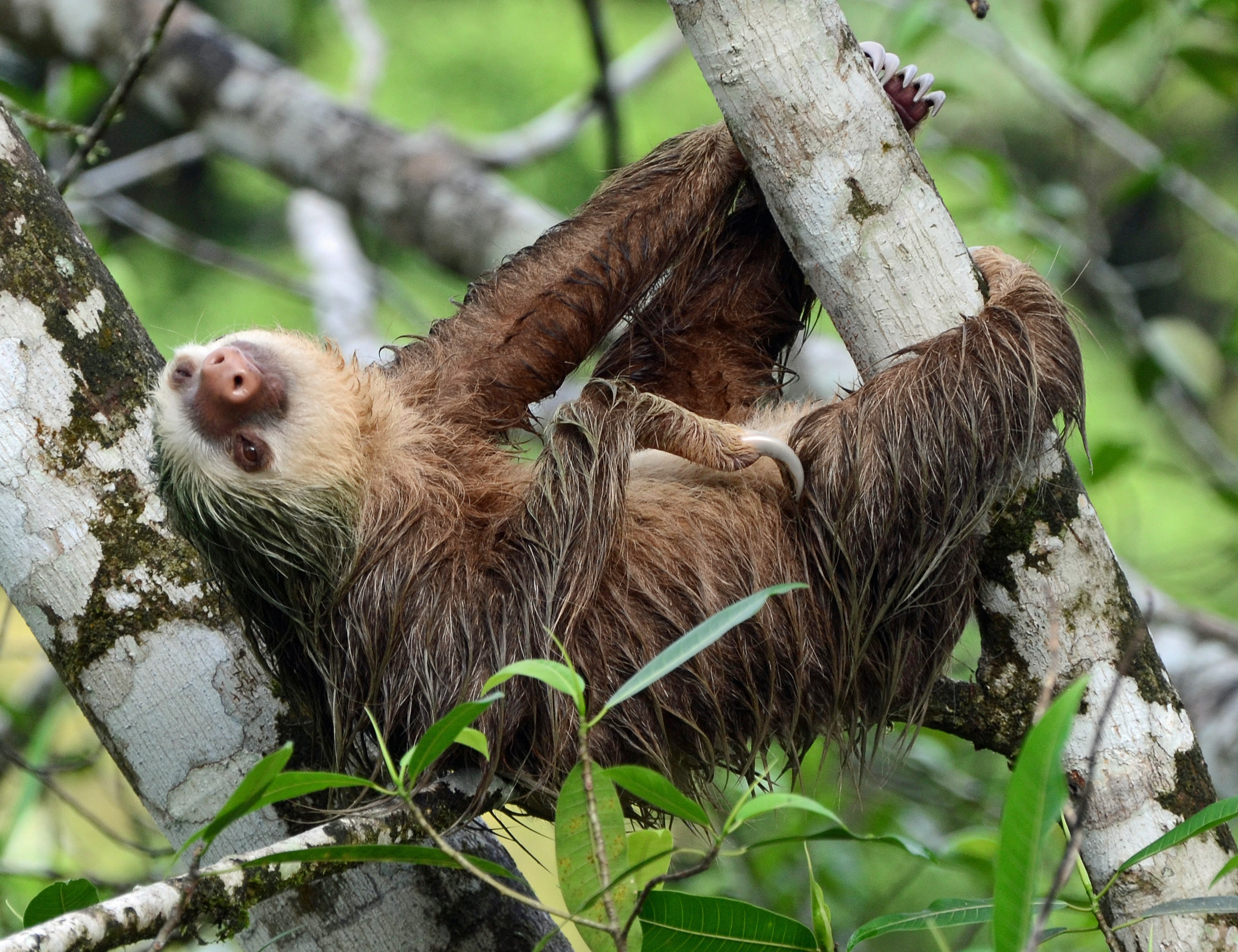
Hoffmann's two-toed sloth

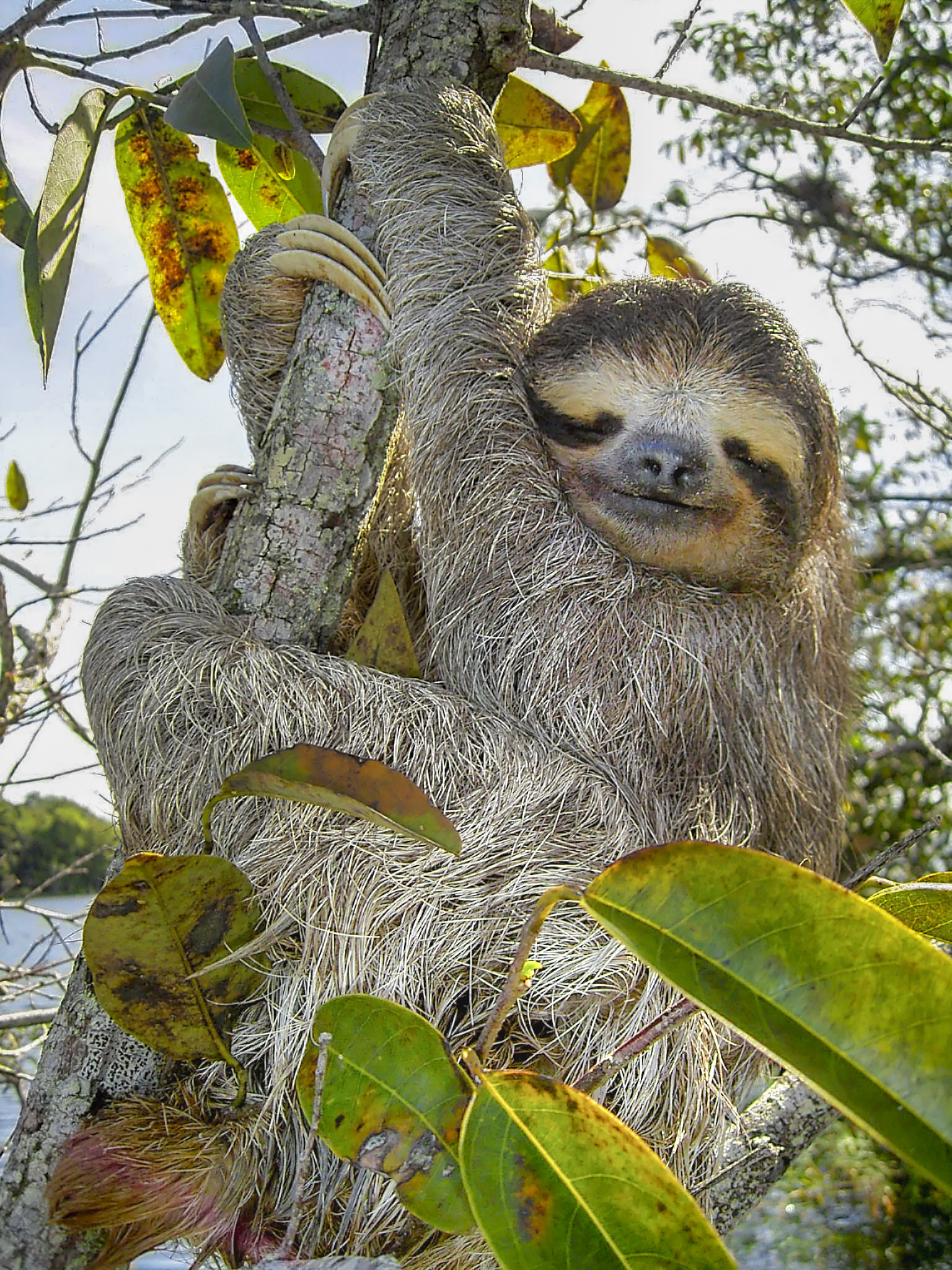
Brown-throated sloth

- Family: Bradypodidae
  - Genus: Bradypus
    - Maned sloth, Bradypus torquatus VU
    - Pale-throated sloth, Bradypus tridactylus LC
    - Brown-throated sloth, Bradypus variegatus LC
- Family: Choloepodidae
  - Genus: Choloepus
    - Linnaeus's two-toed sloth, Choloepus didactylus LC
    - Hoffmann's two-toed sloth, Choloepus hoffmanni LC

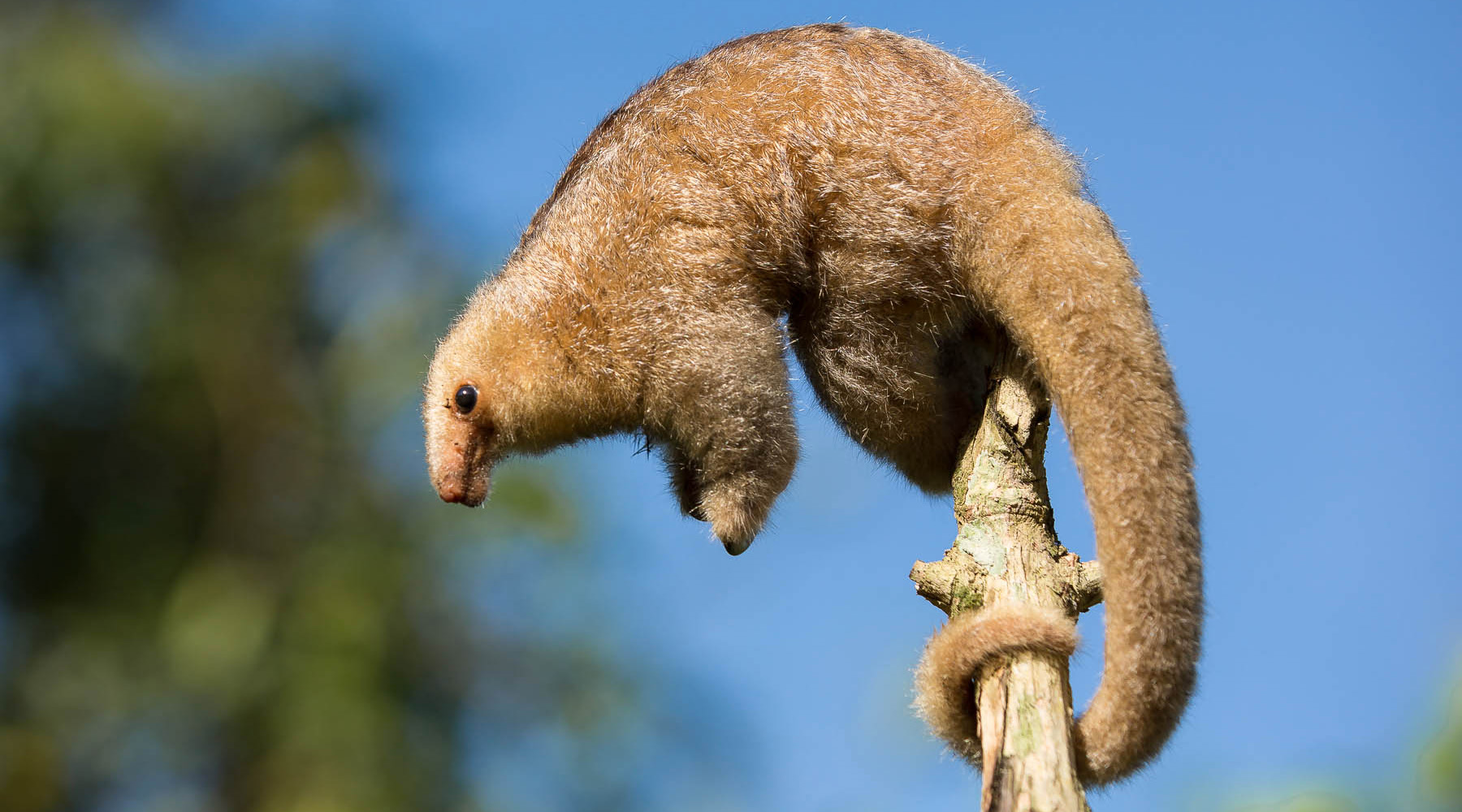
Silky anteater

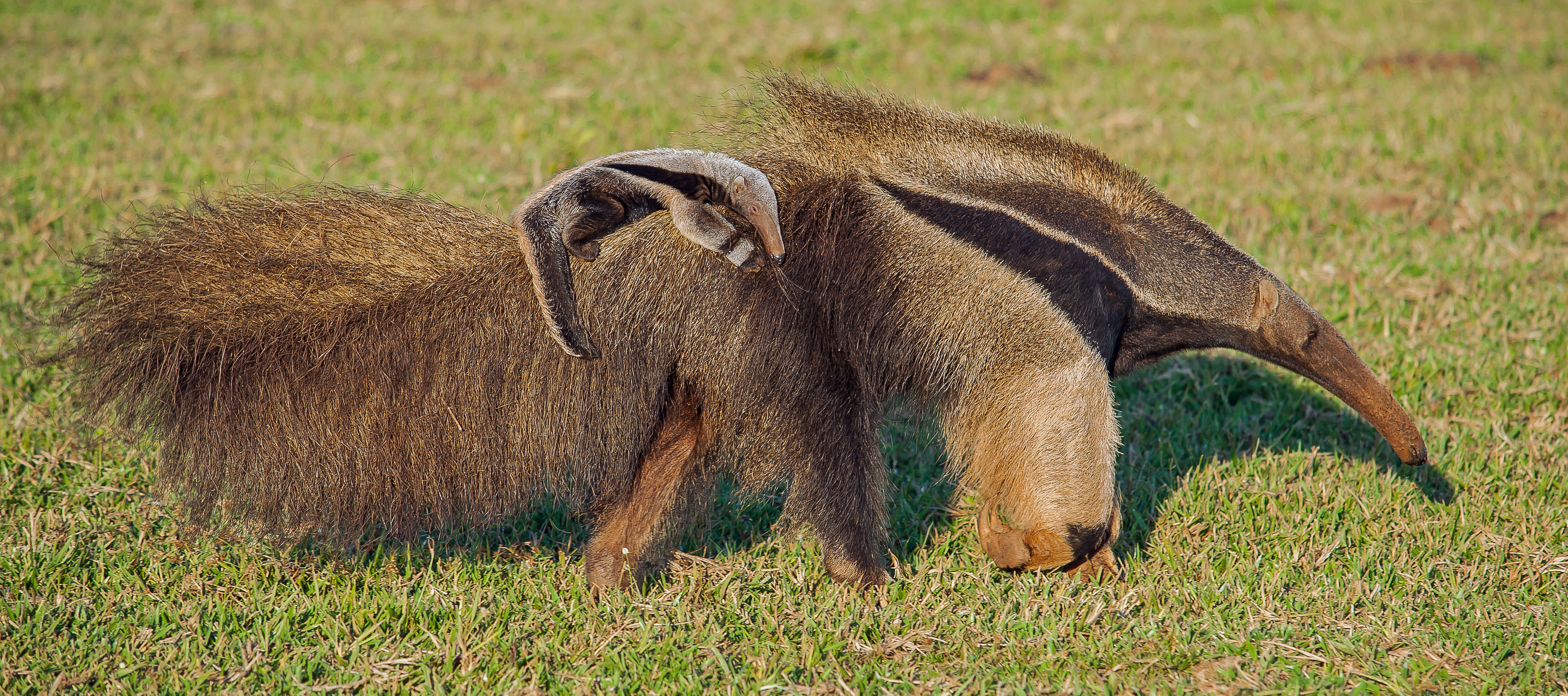
Giant anteater

- Family Cyclopedidae
  - Genus: Cyclopes
    - Silky anteater, Cyclopes didactylus LC
- Family: Myrmecophagidae
  - Genus: Myrmecophaga
    - Giant anteater, Myrmecophaga tridactyla VU
  - Genus: Tamandua
    - Southern tamandua, Tamandua tetradactyla LC

=== Order: Cingulata ===
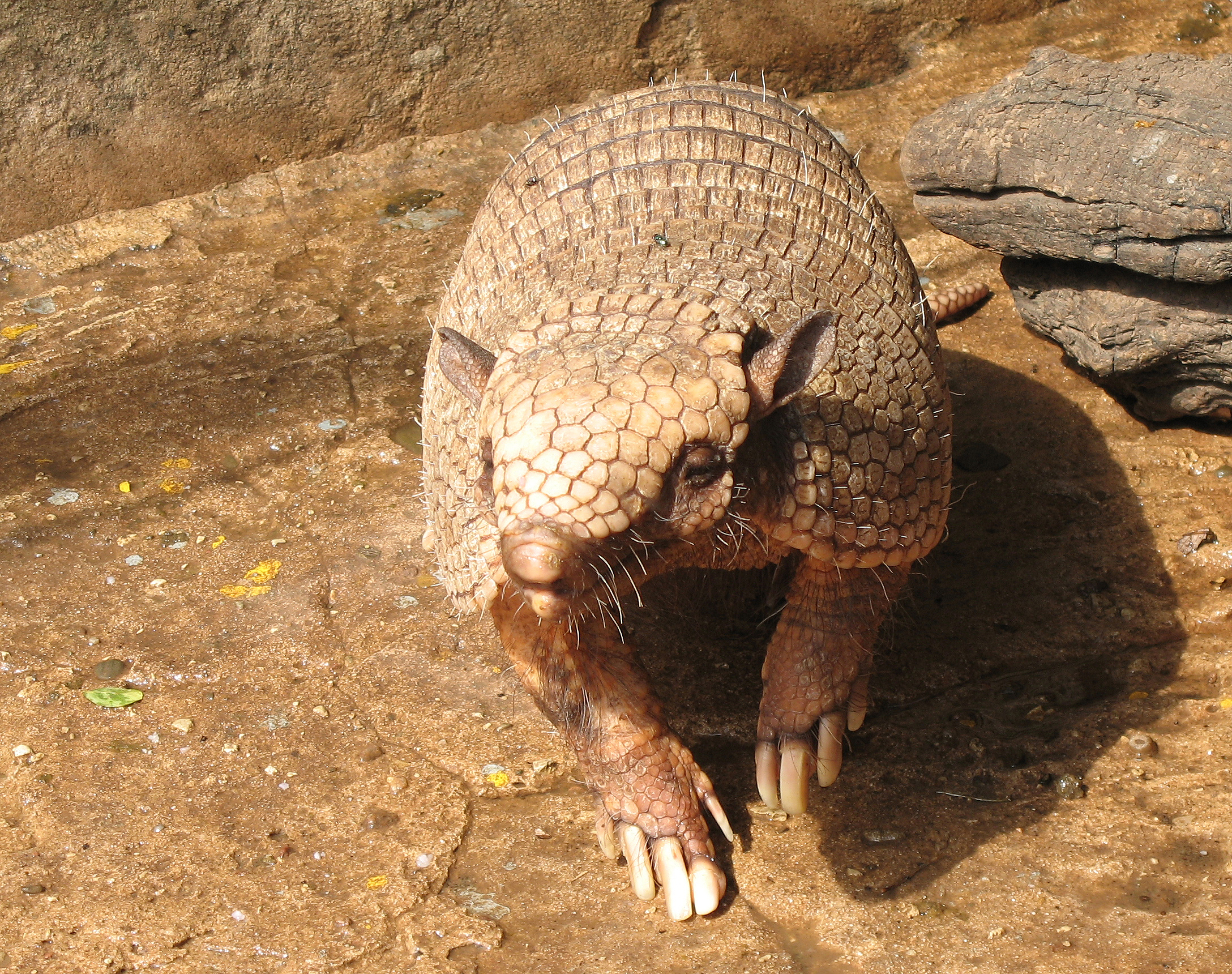
Six-banded armadillo

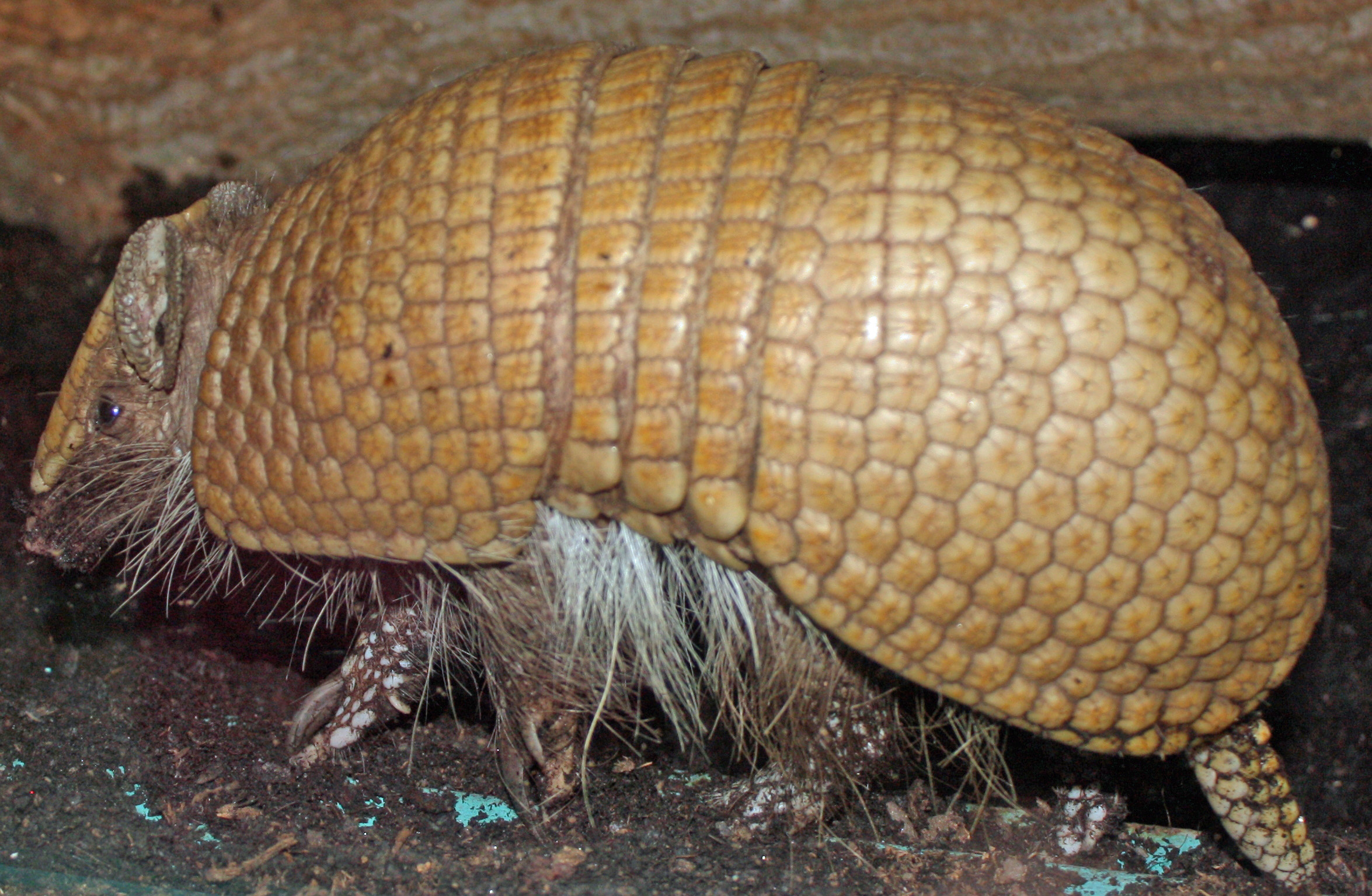
Southern three-banded armadillo

- Family: Dasypodidae
  - Genus: Cabassous
    - Greater naked-tailed armadillo, Cabassous tatouay LC
    - Southern naked-tailed armadillo, Cabassous unicinctus LC
  - Genus: Dasypus
    - Southern long-nosed armadillo, Dasypus hybridus NT
    - Great long-nosed armadillo, Dasypus kappleri LC
    - Nine-banded armadillo, Dasypus novemcinctus LC
    - Seven-banded armadillo, Dasypus septemcinctus LC
  - Genus: Euphractus
    - Six-banded armadillo, Euphractus sexcinctus LC
  - Genus: Priodontes
    - Giant armadillo, Priodontes maximus VU
  - Genus: Tolypeutes
    - Southern three-banded armadillo, Tolypeutes matacus NT
    - Brazilian three-banded armadillo, Tolypeutes tricinctus VU

=== Order: Chiroptera ===
- Family: Emballonuridae
  - Genus: Centronycteris
    - Shaggy bat, Centronycteris maximiliani LR/lc
  - Genus: Cormura
    - Chestnut sac-winged bat, Cormura brevirostris LC
  - Genus: Cyttarops
    - Short-eared bat, Cyttarops alecto LC
  - Genus: Diclidurus
    - Northern ghost bat, Diclidurus albus LR/lc
    - Greater ghost bat, Diclidurus ingens DD
    - Isabelle's ghost bat, Diclidurus isabella LC
    - Lesser ghost bat, Diclidurus scutatus LC
  - Genus: Peropteryx
    - Greater dog-like bat, Peropteryx kappleri LR/lc
    - White-winged dog-like bat, Peropteryx leucoptera LC
    - Lesser dog-like bat, Peropteryx macrotis LR/lc
    - Pale-winged dog-like bat, Peropteryx pallidoptera
  - Genus: Rhynchonycteris
    - Proboscis bat, Rhynchonycteris naso LR/lc
  - Genus: Saccopteryx
    - Greater sac-winged bat, Saccopteryx bilineata LC
    - Frosted sac-winged bat, Saccopteryx canescens LC
    - Amazonian sac-winged bat, Saccopteryx gymnura DD
    - Lesser sac-winged bat, Saccopteryx leptura LC
- Family: Phyllostomidae
  - Subfamily: Desmodontinae
    - Genus: Desmodus
      - Common vampire bat, Desmodus rotundus LC
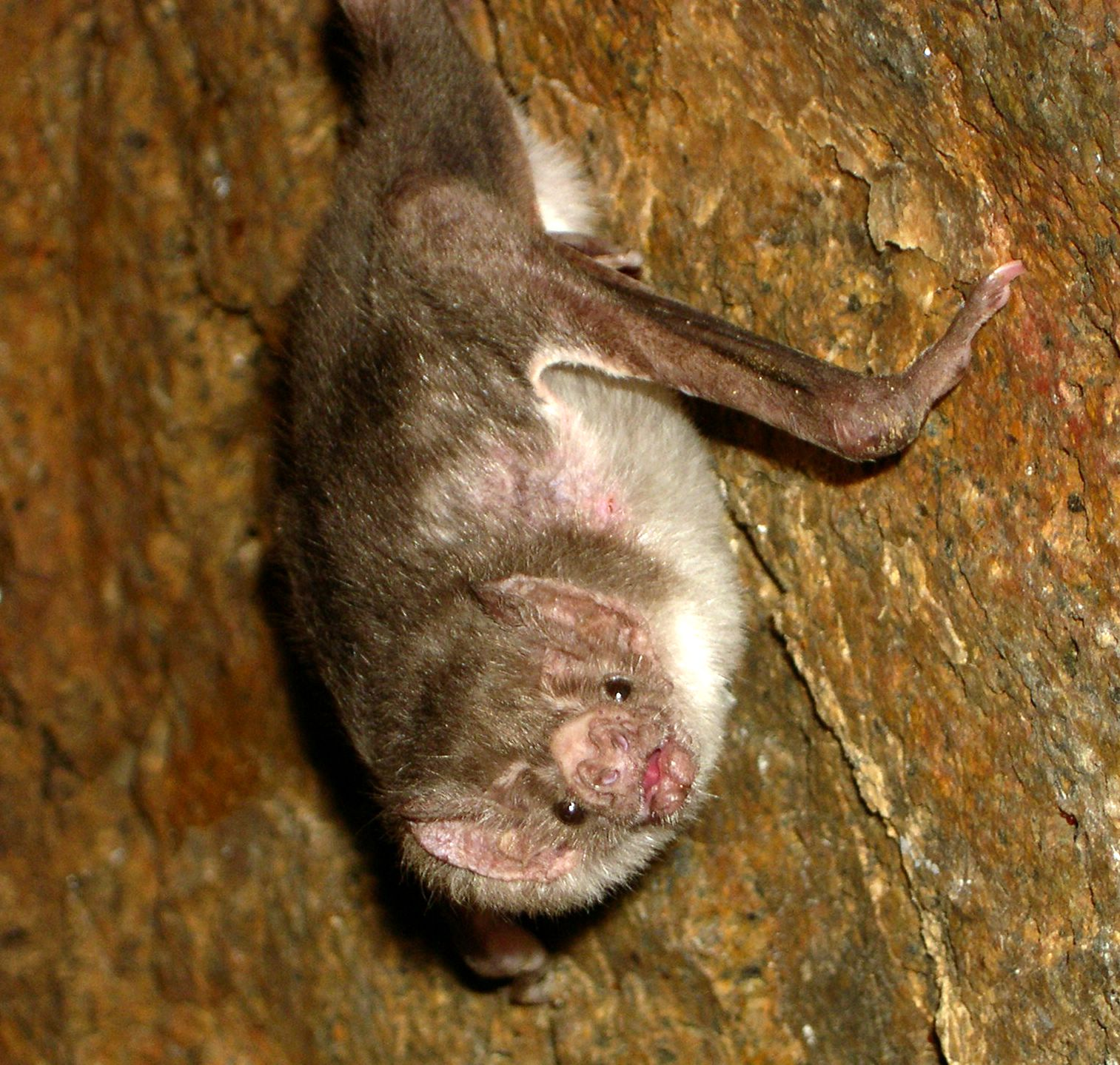
        Vampire bat
    - Genus: Diaemus
      - White-winged vampire bat, Diaemus youngii LC
    - Genus: Diphylla
      - Hairy-legged vampire bat, Diphylla ecaudata LC
  - Subfamily: Glossophaginae
    - Genus: Anoura
      - Tailed tailless bat, Anoura caudifer LC
      - Geoffroy's tailless bat, Anoura geoffroyi LC
    - Genus: Choeroniscus
      - Minor long-nosed long-tongued bat, Choeroniscus minor LC
    - Genus: Glossophaga
      - Commissaris's long-tongued bat, Glossophaga commissarisi LR/lc
      - Miller's long-tongued bat, Glossophaga longirostris DD
      - Pallas's long-tongued bat, Glossophaga soricina LR/lc
    - Genus: Hsunycteris
      - Thomas's nectar bat, Hsunycteris thomasi LC
    - Genus: Lichonycteris
      - Dark long-tongued bat, Lichonycteris degener LR/lc
    - Genus: Lionycteris
      - Chestnut long-tongued bat, Lionycteris spurrelli LC
    - Genus: Lonchophylla
      - Bokermann's nectar bat, Lonchophylla bokermanni DD
      - Dekeyser's nectar bat, Lonchophylla dekeyseri NT
      - Lonchophylla inexpectata, Lonchophylla inexpectata
      - Godman's nectar bat, Lonchophylla mordax LC
      - Peracchi's nectar bat, Lonchophylla peracchii
    - Genus: Scleronycteris
      - Ega long-tongued bat, Scleronycteris ega LC
  - Subfamily: Carolliinae
  - Genus: Rhinophylla
    - Fischer's little fruit bat, Rhinophylla fischerae LC
    - Dwarf little fruit bat, Rhinophylla pumilio LC
  - Genus: Carollia
    - Benkeith's short-tailed bat, Carollia benkeithi
    - Silky short-tailed bat, Carollia brevicauda LR/lc
    - Seba's short-tailed bat, Carollia perspicillata LR/lc
    - Little white-shouldered bat, Ametrida centurio LC
  - Subfamily: Phyllostominae
    - Genus: Chrotopterus
      - Big-eared woolly bat, Chrotopterus auritus LR/lc
    - Genus: Garnderycteris
      - Striped hairy-nosed bat, Gardnerycteris crenulatum LR/lc
    - Genus: Glyphonycteris
      - Davies's big-eared bat, Glyphonycteris daviesi DD
      - Tricolored big-eared bat, Glyphonycteris sylvestris LC
    - Genus: Lampronycteris
      - Yellow-throated big-eared bat, Lampronycteris brachyotis LC
    - Genus: Lonchorhina
      - Tomes's sword-nosed bat, Lonchorhina aurita LR/lc
      - Northern sword-nosed bat, Lonchorhina inusitata DD
    - Genus: Lophostoma
      - Pygmy round-eared bat, Lophostoma brasiliense LR/lc
      - Carriker's round-eared bat, Lophostoma carrikeri LC
      - Schultz's round-eared bat, Lophostoma schulzi LC
      - White-throated round-eared bat, Lophostoma silvicola LC
    - Genus: Macrophyllum
      - Long-legged bat, Macrophyllum macrophyllum LC
    - Genus: Micronycteris
      - Brosset's big-eared bat, Micronycteris brosseti DD
      - Hairy big-eared bat, Micronycteris hirsuta LC
      - Little big-eared bat, Micronycteris megalotis LC
      - Common big-eared bat, Micronycteris microtis LC
      - White-bellied big-eared bat, Micronycteris minuta LC
      - Sanborn's big-eared bat, Micronycteris sanborni DD
      - Schmidts's big-eared bat, Micronycteris schmidtorum LR/lc
    - Genus: Mimon
      - Golden bat, Mimon bennettii LC
    - Genus: Neonycteris
      - Least big-eared bat, Neonycteris pusilla VU
    - Genus: Phylloderma
      - Pale-faced bat, Phylloderma stenops LR/lc
    - Genus: Phyllostomus
      - Pale spear-nosed bat, Phyllostomus discolor LC
      - Lesser spear-nosed bat, Phyllostomus elongatus LC
      - Greater spear-nosed bat, Phyllostomus hastatus LC
      - Guianan spear-nosed bat, Phyllostomus latifolius LC
    - Genus: Tonatia
      - Greater round-eared bat, Tonatia bidens DD
      - Stripe-headed round-eared bat, Tonatia saurophila LR/lc
    - Genus: Trachops
      - Fringe-lipped bat, Trachops cirrhosus LC
    - Genus: Trinycteris
      - Niceforo's big-eared bat, Trinycteris nicefori LC
    - Genus: Vampyrum
      - Spectral bat, Vampyrum spectrum NT
  - Subfamily: Stenodermatinae
    - Genus: Artibeus
      - Brown fruit-eating bat, Artibeus concolor LC
      - Fringed fruit-eating bat, Artibeus fimbriatus LC
      - Great fruit-eating bat, Artibeus lituratus LC
      - Dark fruit-eating bat, Artibeus obscurus LC
      - Flat-faced fruit-eating bat, Artibeus planirostris LR/lc
    - Genus: Chiroderma
      - Brazilian big-eyed bat, Chiroderma doriae LC
      - Salvin's big-eyed bat, Chiroderma salvini LR/lc
      - Little big-eyed bat, Chiroderma trinitatum LC
      - Hairy big-eyed bat, Chiroderma villosum LR/lc
      - Vizotto's big-eyed bat, Chiroderma vizottoi LR/lc
    - Genus: Dermanura
      - Andersen's fruit-eating bat, Dermanura anderseni LC
      - Bogota fruit-eating bat, Dermanura bogotensis
      - Gervais's fruit-eating bat, Dermanura cinerea LC
      - Gnome fruit-eating bat, Artibeus gnoma LC
    - Genus: Mesophylla
      - MacConnell's bat, Mesophylla macconnelli LC
    - Genus: Platyrrhinus
      - Slender broad-nosed bat, Platyrrhinus angustirostris
      - Eldorado broad-nosed bat, Platyrrhinus aurarius
      - Short-headed broad-nosed bat, Platyrrhinus brachycephalus LC
      - Brown-bellied broad-nosed bat, Platyrrhinus fusciventris LC
      - Heller's broad-nosed bat, Platyrrhinus helleri LC
      - Incan broad-nosed bat, Platyrrhinus incarum LC
      - Buffy broad-nosed bat, Platyrrhinus infuscus LC
      - White-lined broad-nosed bat, Platyrrhinus lineatus LC
      - Recife broad-nosed bat, Platyrrhinus recifinus LC
    - Genus: Pygoderma
      - Ipanema bat, Pygoderma bilabiatum LC
    - Genus: Sphaeronycteris
      - Visored bat, Sphaeronycteris toxophyllum DD
    - Genus: Sturnira
      - Little yellow-shouldered bat, Sturnira lilium LR/lc
      - Greater yellow-shouldered bat, Sturnira magna
      - Tilda's yellow-shouldered bat, Sturnira tildae LC
    - Genus: Uroderma
      - Tent-making bat, Uroderma bilobatum LR/lc
      - Brown tent-making bat, Uroderma magnirostrum LR/lc
    - Genus: Vampyressa
      - Southern little yellow-eared bat, Vampyressa pusilla DD
      - Northern little yellow-eared bat, Vampyressa thyone LC
    - Genus: Vampyriscus
      - Bidentate yellow-eared bat, Vampyriscus bidens LC
      - Brock's yellow-eared bat, Vampyriscus brocki LC
    - Genus: Vampyrodes
      - Great stripe-faced bat, Vampyrodes caraccioli LC
- Family: Mormoopidae
  - Genus: Pteronotus
    - Big naked-backed bat, Pteronotus gymnonotus LR/lc
    - Parnell's mustached bat, Pteronotus parnellii LR/lc
    - Wagner's mustached bat, Pteronotus personatus LC
- Family: Noctilionidae
  - Genus: Noctilio
    - Lesser bulldog bat, Noctilio albiventris LC
    - Greater bulldog bat, Noctilio leporinus LC
- Family: Furipteridae
  - Genus: Furipterus
    - Thumbless bat, Furipterus horrens LC
- Family: Thyropteridae
  - Genus: Thyroptera
    - De Vivo's disk-winged bat, Thyroptera devivoi DD
    - Peters's disk-winged bat, Thyroptera discifera LC
    - LaVal's disk-winged bat, Thyroptera lavali
    - Spix's disk-winged bat, Thyroptera tricolor LC
    - Patricia's disk-winged bat, Thyroptera wynneae
- Family: Natalidae
  - Genus: Natalus
    - Brazilian funnel-eared bat, Natalus macrourus LC
- Family: Molossidae
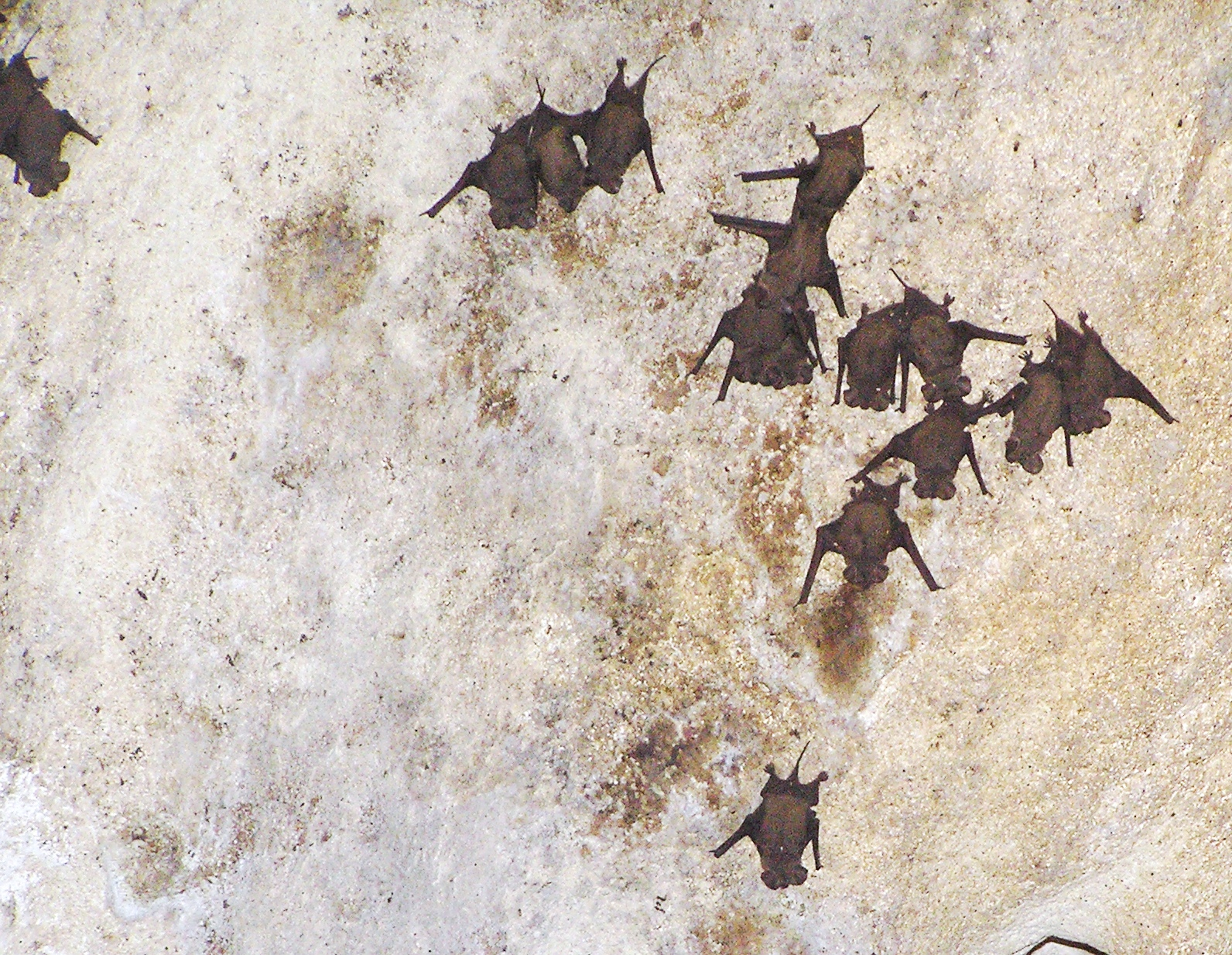
  Brazilian free-tailed bat
  - Genus: Cynomops
    - Cinnamon dog-faced bat, Cynomops abrasus DD
    - Greenhall's dog-faced bat, Cynomops greenhalli
    - Miller's dog-faced bat, Cynomops milleri
    - Para dog-faced bat, Cynomops paranus DD
    - Southern dog-faced bat, Cynomops planirostris LC
  - Genus: Eumops
    - Black bonneted bat, Eumops auripendulus LC
    - Dwarf bonneted bat, Eumops bonariensis LC
    - Eumops delticus
    - Wagner's bonneted bat, Eumops glaucinus LC
    - Sanborn's bonneted bat, Eumops hansae LC
    - Guianan bonneted bat, Eumops maurus LC
    - Patagonian bonneted bat, Eumops patagonicus LC
    - Western bonneted bat, Eumops perotis LC
    - Colombian bonneted bat, Eumops trumbulli LC
  - Genus: Molossops
    - Rufous dog-faced bat, Molossops neglectus DD
    - Dwarf dog-faced bat, Molossops temminckii LC
  - Genus: Molossus
    - Aztec mastiff bat, Molossus aztecus
    - Coiba mastiff bat, Molossus coibensis
    - Bonda mastiff bat, Molossus currentium
    - Velvety free-tailed bat, Molossus molossus LC
    - Miller's mastiff bat, Molossus pretiosus
    - Black mastiff bat, Molossus rufus LC
  - Genus: Neoplatymops
    - Mato Grosso dog-faced bat, Neoplatymops mattogrossensis LC
  - Genus: Nyctinomops
    - Peale's free-tailed bat, Nyctinomops aurispinosus LC
    - Broad-eared bat, Nyctinomops laticaudatus LC
    - Big free-tailed bat, Nyctinomops macrotis LC
  - Genus: Promops
    - Big crested mastiff bat, Promops centralis LC
    - Brown mastiff bat, Promops nasutus LC
  - Genus: Tadarida
    - Brazilian free-tailed bat, Tadarida brasiliensis LC

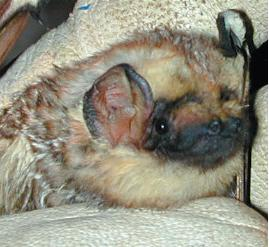
Hoary bat

- Family: Vespertilionidae
  - Genus: Eptesicus
    - Little black serotine, Eptesicu andinus
    - Brazilian brown bat, Eptesicus brasiliensis LC
    - Chiriquinan serotine, Eptesicus chiriquinus
    - Diminutive serotine, Eptesicus diminutus DD
    - Argentine brown bat, Eptesicus furinalis LC
    - Taddei serotine, Eptesicus taddeii
  - Genus: Histiotus
    - Strange big-eared brown bat, Histiotus alienus DD
    - Thomas's big-eared brown bat, Histiotus laephotis DD
    - Small big-eared brown bat, Histiotus montanus DD
    - Tropical big-eared brown bat, Histiotus velatus DD
  - Genus: Lasiurus
    - Desert red bat, Lasiurus blossevillii LC
    - Tacarcuna bat, Lasiurus castaneus DD
    - Hoary bat, Lasiurus cinereus LC
    - Hairy-tailed bat, Lasiurus ebenus DD
    - Southern yellow bat, Lasiurus ega LC
    - Big red bat, Lasiurus egregius DD
    - Saline red bat, Lasiurus salinae
  - Genus: Rhogeessa
    - Husson's yellow bat, Rhogeessa hussoni LC
    - Thomas's yellow bat, Rhogeessa io LC
  - Genus: Myotis
    - Silver-tipped myotis, Myotis albescens LC
    - Myotis dinellii
    - Izecksohn's myotis, Myotis izecksohni
    - LaVal's myotis, Myotis lavali
    - Yellowish myotis, Myotis levis LC
    - Black myotis, Myotis nigricans LR/lc
    - Riparian myotis, Myotis riparius LC
    - Red myotis, Myotis ruber NT
    - Velvety myotis, Myotis simus DD

=== Order: Primates ===
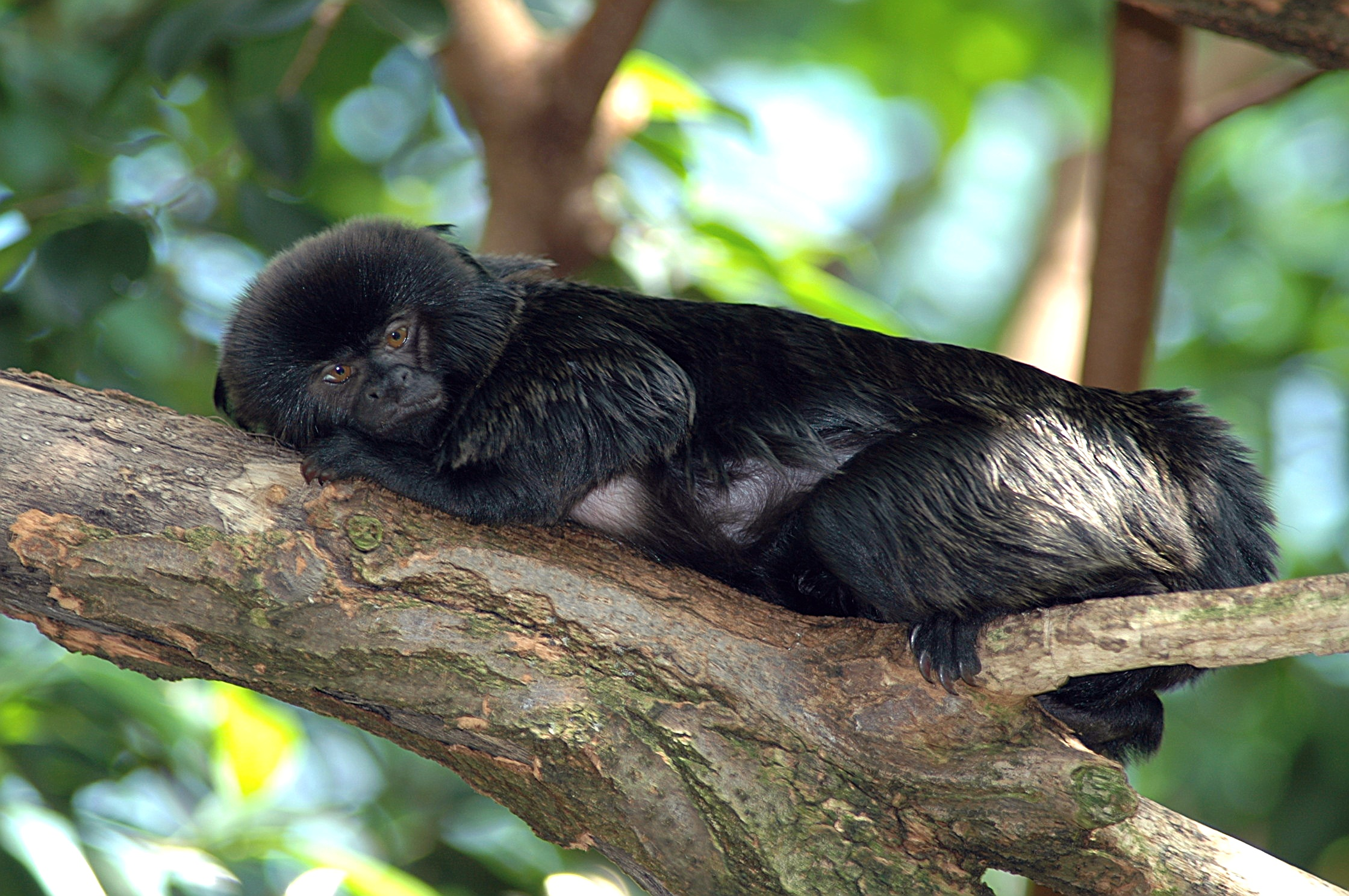
Goeldi's marmoset

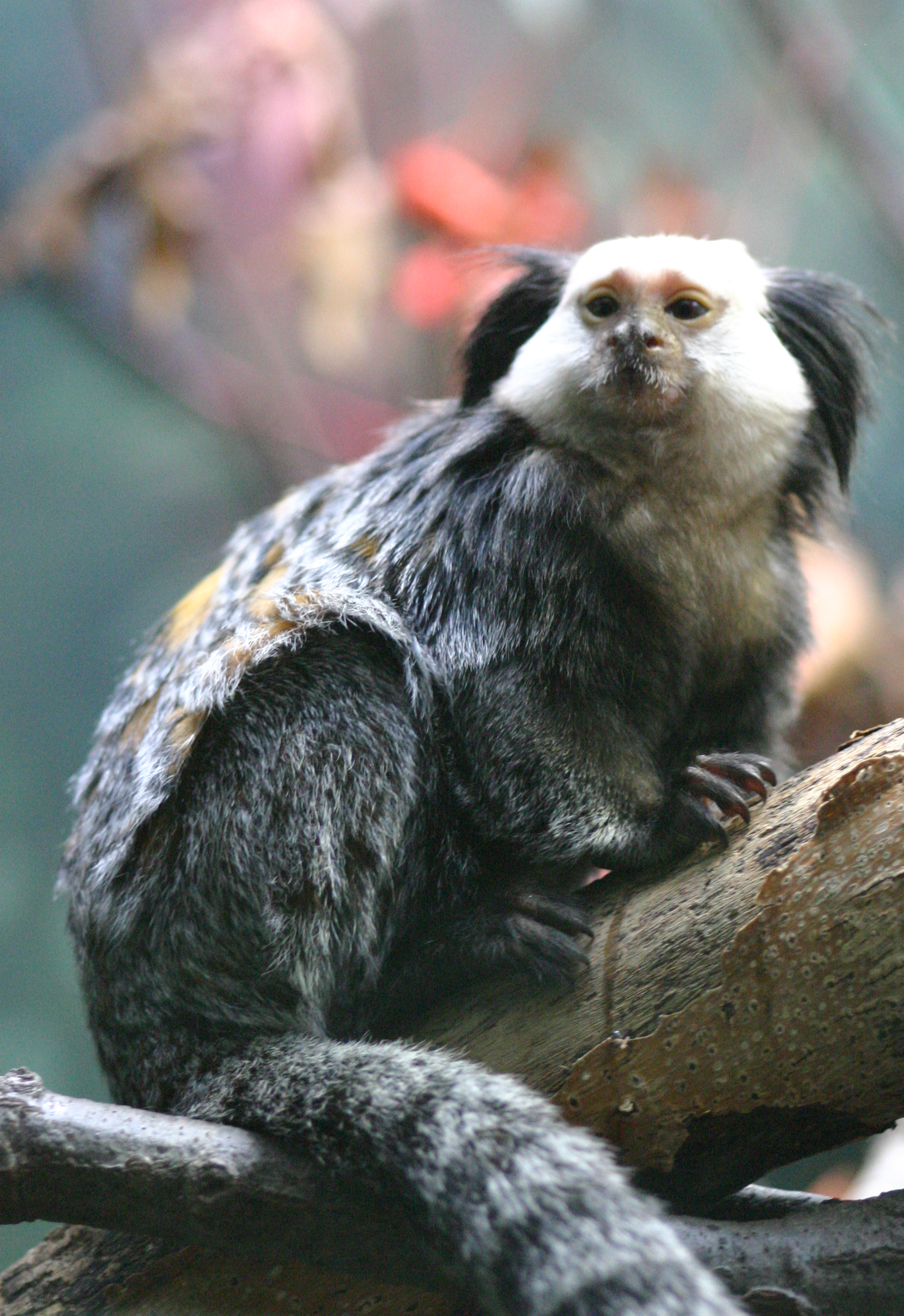
White-headed marmoset

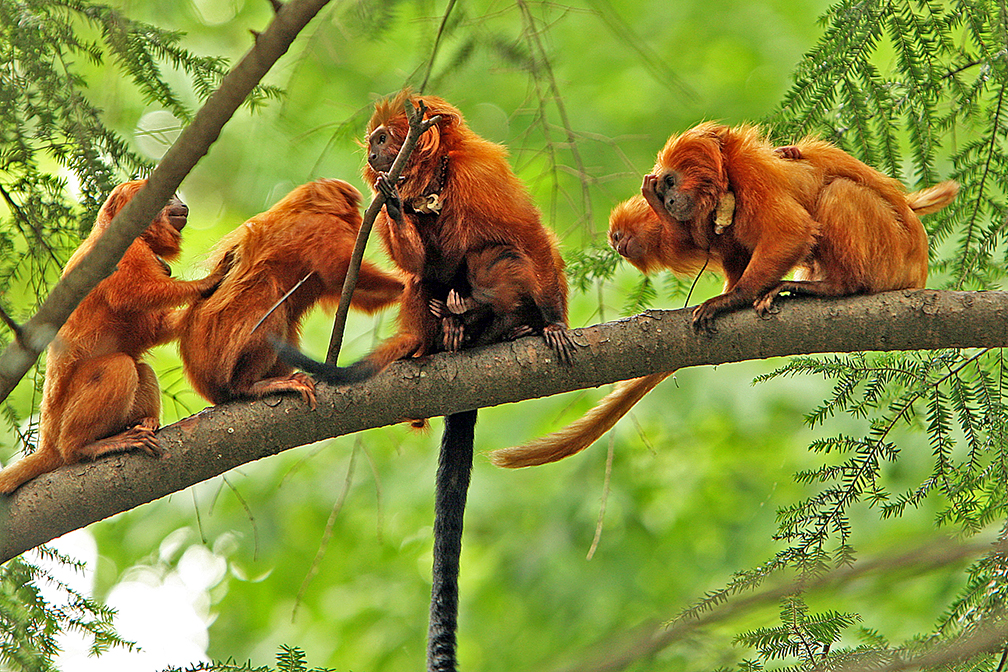
Golden lion tamarin

- Family: Callitrichidae
  - Genus: Callimico
    - Goeldi's marmoset, Callimico goeldii VU
  - Genus: Callithrix
    - Buffy-tufted marmoset, Callithrix aurita VU
    - Buffy-headed marmoset, Callithrix flaviceps EN
    - White-headed marmoset, Callithrix geoffroyi LC
    - Common marmoset, Callithrix jacchus LC
    - Wied's marmoset, Callithrix kuhlii NT
    - Black-tufted marmoset, Callithrix penicillata LC
  - Genus: Cebuella
    - Pygmy marmoset, Cebuella pygmaea LC
  - Genus: Leontocebus
    - Cruz Lima's saddle-back tamarin, Leontocebus cruzlimai LC
    - Lesson's saddle-back tamarin, Leontocebus fuscus LC
    - Brown-mantled tamarin, Leontocebus fuscicollis LC
    - Black-mantled tamarin, Leontocebus nigricollis LC
    - Weddell's saddle-back tamarin, Leontocebus weddelli LC
  - Genus: Leontopithecus
    - Superagui lion tamarin, Leontopithecus caissara CR
    - Golden-headed lion tamarin, Leontopithecus chrysomelas EN
    - Black lion tamarin, Leontopithecus chrysopygus EN
    - Golden lion tamarin, Leontopithecus rosalia EN
  - Genus: Mico
    - Rio Acari marmoset, Mico acariensis DD
    - Gold-and-white marmoset, Mico chrysoleucus DD
    - Emilia's marmoset, Mico emiliae DD
    - Santarem marmoset, Mico humeralifer DD
    - Roosmalens' dwarf marmoset, Mico humilis VU
    - Hershkovitz's marmoset, Mico intermedia LC
    - White marmoset, Mico leucippe VU
    - Manicore marmoset, Mico manicorensis LC
    - Marca's marmoset, Mico marcai DD
    - Maués marmoset, Mico mauesi LC
    - Munduruku marmoset, Mico munduruku VU
    - Black-tailed marmoset, Mico melanurus LC
    - Black-headed marmoset, Mico nigriceps DD
    - Sateré marmoset, Mico saterei LC
  - Genus: Saguinus
    - Pied tamarin, Saguinus bicolor EN
    - Emperor tamarin, Saguinus imperator LC
    - Mottle-faced tamarin, Saguinus inustus LC
    - White-lipped tamarin, Saguinus labiatus LC
    - Martins's tamarin, Saguinus martinsi LC
    - Red-handed tamarin, Saguinus midas LC
    - Moustached tamarin, Saguinus mystax LC
    - Black tamarin, Saguinus niger VU

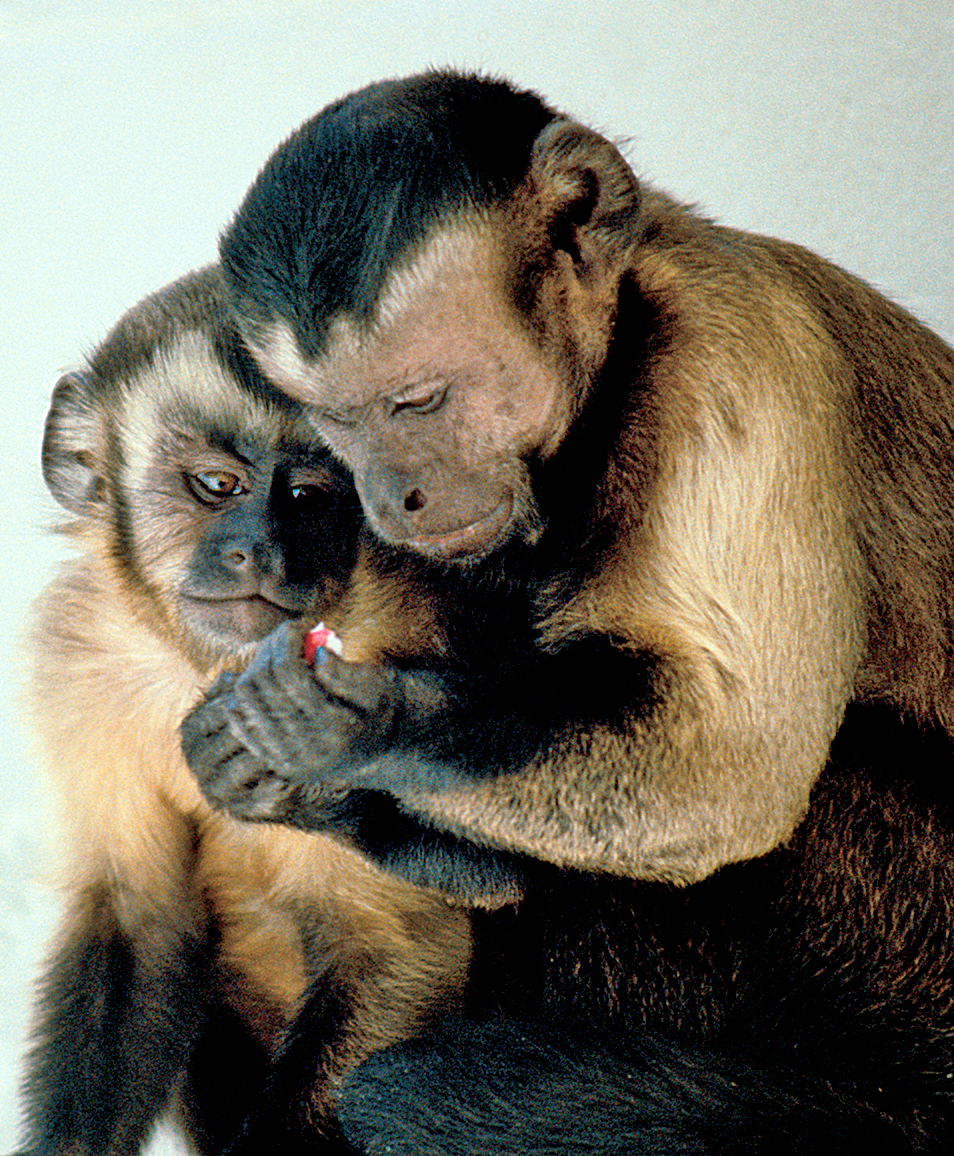
Tufted capuchin

- Family: Cebidae
  - Genus: Cebus
    - Humboldt's white-fronted capuchin, Cebus albifrons LC
    - Kaapori capuchin, Cebus kaapori CR
    - Spix's white-fronted capuchin, Cebus unicolor
    - Wedge-capped capuchin, Cebus olivaceus LC
    - Marañón white-fronted capuchin, Cebus yuracus
  - Genus: Sapajus
    - Tufted capuchin, Sapajus apella LC
    - Black-striped capuchin, Sapajus libidinosus LC
    - Large-headed capuchin, Sapajus macrocephalus LC
    - Black capuchin, Sapajus nigritus NT
    - Crested capuchin, Sapajus robustus EN
    - Golden-bellied capuchin, Sapajus xanthosternos CR
  - Genus: Saimiri
    - Black-capped squirrel monkey, Saimiri boliviensis LC
    - Collins' squirrel monkey, Saimiri collinsi
    - Humboldt's squirrel monkey, Saimiri cassiquiarensis
    - Guianan squirrel monkey, Saimiri sciureus LC
    - Bare-eared squirrel monkey, Saimiri ustus NT
    - Black squirrel monkey, Saimiri vanzolinii VU
- Family: Aotidae
  - Genus: Aotus
    - Feline night monkey, Aotus azarae LC
    - Nancy Ma's night monkey, Aotus nancymaae LC
    - Black-headed night monkey, Aotus nigriceps LC
    - Three-striped night monkey, Aotus trivirgatus LC
    - Spix's night monkey, Aotus vociferans LC

Bald uakari

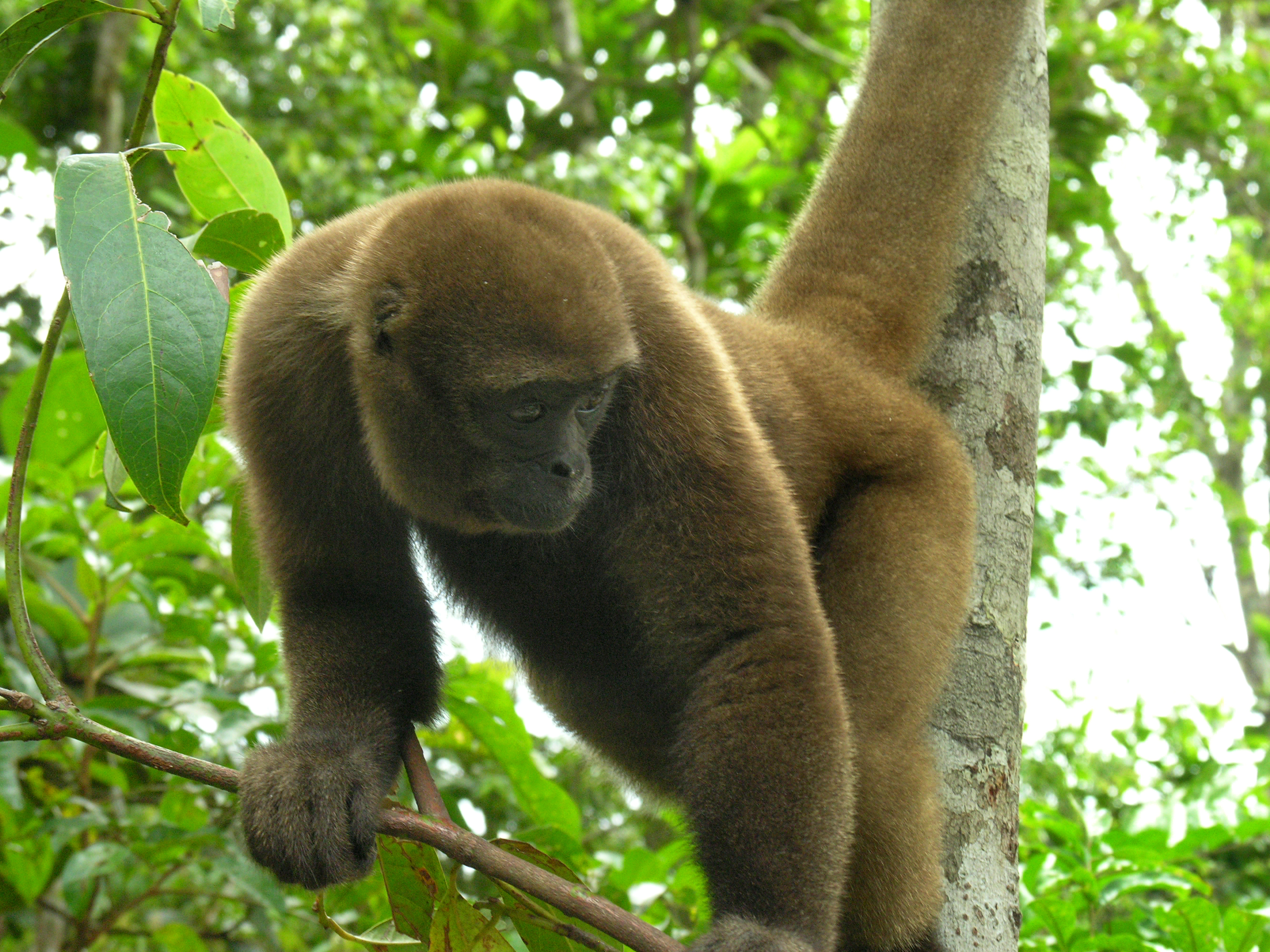
Brown woolly monkey

- Family: Pitheciidae
  - Genus: Cacajao
    - Bald uakari, Cacajao calvus VU
    - Black-headed uakari, Cacajao melanocephalus LC
    - Aracá uakari, Cacajao ayresi VU
    - Neblina uakari, Cacajao hosomi VU
  - Genus: Callicebus
    - Baptista Lake titi, Callicebus baptista LC
    - Barbara Brown's titi, Callicebus barbarabrownae CR
    - Prince Bernhard's titi, Callicebus bernhardi LC
    - Brown titi, Callicebus brunneus LC
    - Chestnut-bellied titi, Callicebus brunneus LC
    - Ashy black titi, Callicebus cinerascens LC
    - Coimbra Filho's titi, Callicebus coimbrai EN
    - Coppery titi, Callicebus cupreus LC
    - White-eared titi, Callicebus donacophilus LC
    - Hershkovitz's titi, Callicebus dubius LC
    - Hoffmanns's titi, Callicebus hoffmannsi LC
    - Lucifer titi, Callicebus lucifer LC
    - Black titi, Callicebus lugens LC
    - Coastal black-handed titi, Callicebus melanochir VU
    - Red-bellied titi, Callicebus moloch LC
    - Black-fronted titi, Callicebus nigrifrons NT
    - White-coated titi, Callicebus pallescens LC
    - Atlantic titi, Callicebus personatus VU
    - Rio Purus titi, Callicebus purinus LC
    - Red-headed titi, Callicebus regulus LC
    - Stephen Nash's titi, Callicebus stephennashi DD
    - Collared titi, Callicebus torquatus LC
  - Genus: Chiropotes
    - White-nosed saki, Chiropotes albinasus EN
    - Red-backed bearded saki, Chiropotes chiropotes LC
    - Brown-backed bearded saki, Chiropotes israelita
    - Black bearded saki, Chiropotes satanas CR
    - Uta Hick's bearded saki, Chiropotes utahicki EN
  - Genus: Pithecia
    - White-footed saki, Pithecia albicans VU
    - Rio Tapajós saki, Pithecia irrorata LC
    - Monk saki, Pithecia monachus LC
    - White-faced saki, Pithecia pithecia

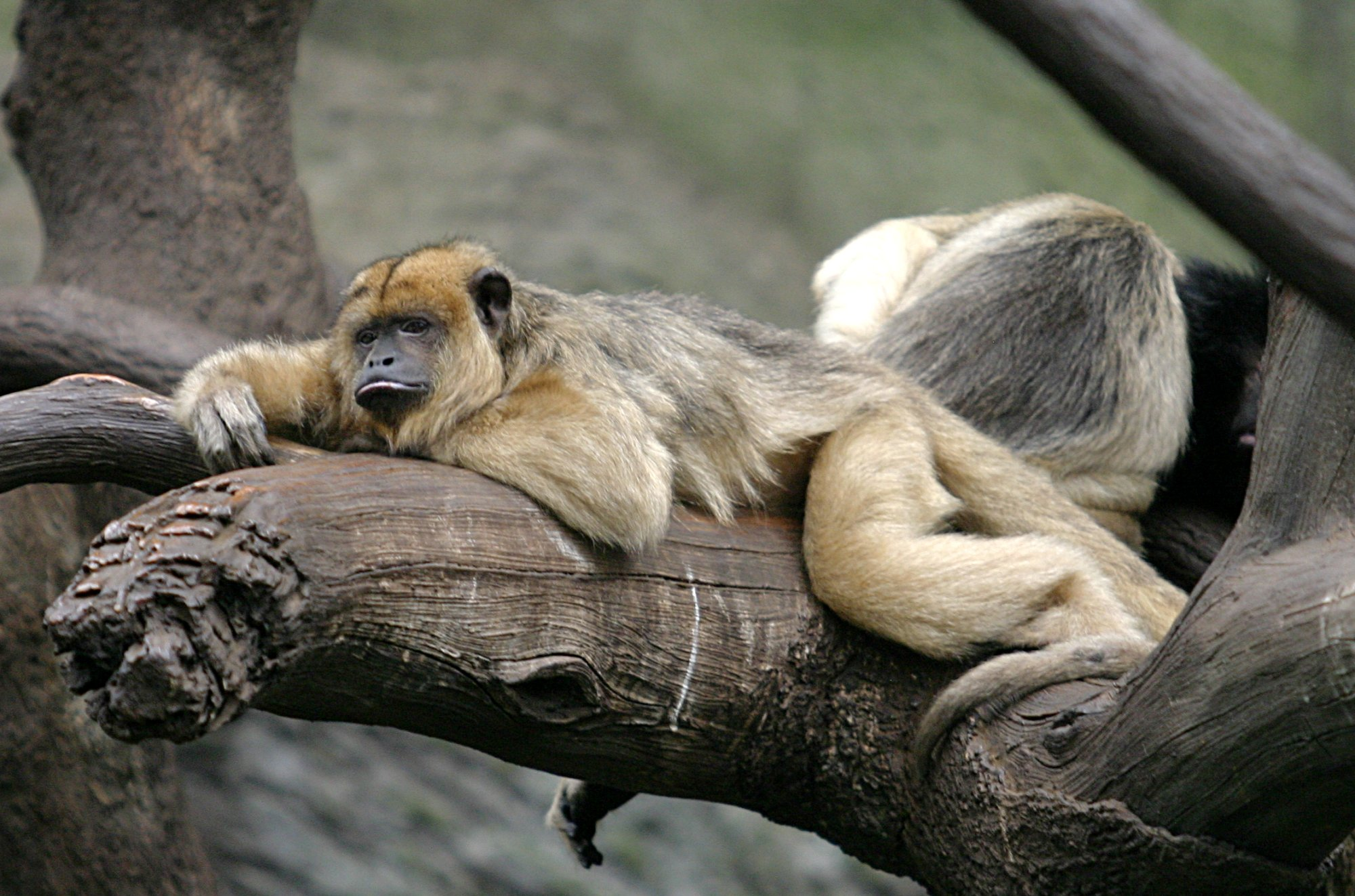
Black howler

- Family: Atelidae
  - Genus: Alouatta
    - Red-handed howler, Alouatta belzebul VU
    - Black howler, Alouatta caraya LC
    - Brown howler, Alouatta guariba LC
    - Amazon black howler, Alouatta nigerrima LC
    - Venezuelan red howler, Alouatta seniculus LC
    - Maranhão red-handed howler, Alouatta ululata EN
  - Genus: Ateles
    - White-fronted spider monkey, Ateles belzebuth EN
    - Peruvian spider monkey, Ateles chamek EN
    - White-cheeked spider monkey, Ateles marginatus EN
    - Red-faced spider monkey, Ateles paniscus VU
  - Genus: Brachyteles
    - Southern muriqui, Brachyteles arachnoides EN
    - Northern muriqui, Brachyteles hypoxanthus CR
  - Genus: Lagothrix
    - Gray woolly monkey, Lagothrix cana EN
    - Brown woolly monkey, Lagothrix lagothricha VU
    - Silvery woolly monkey, Lagothrix poeppigii VU

=== Order: Carnivora ===
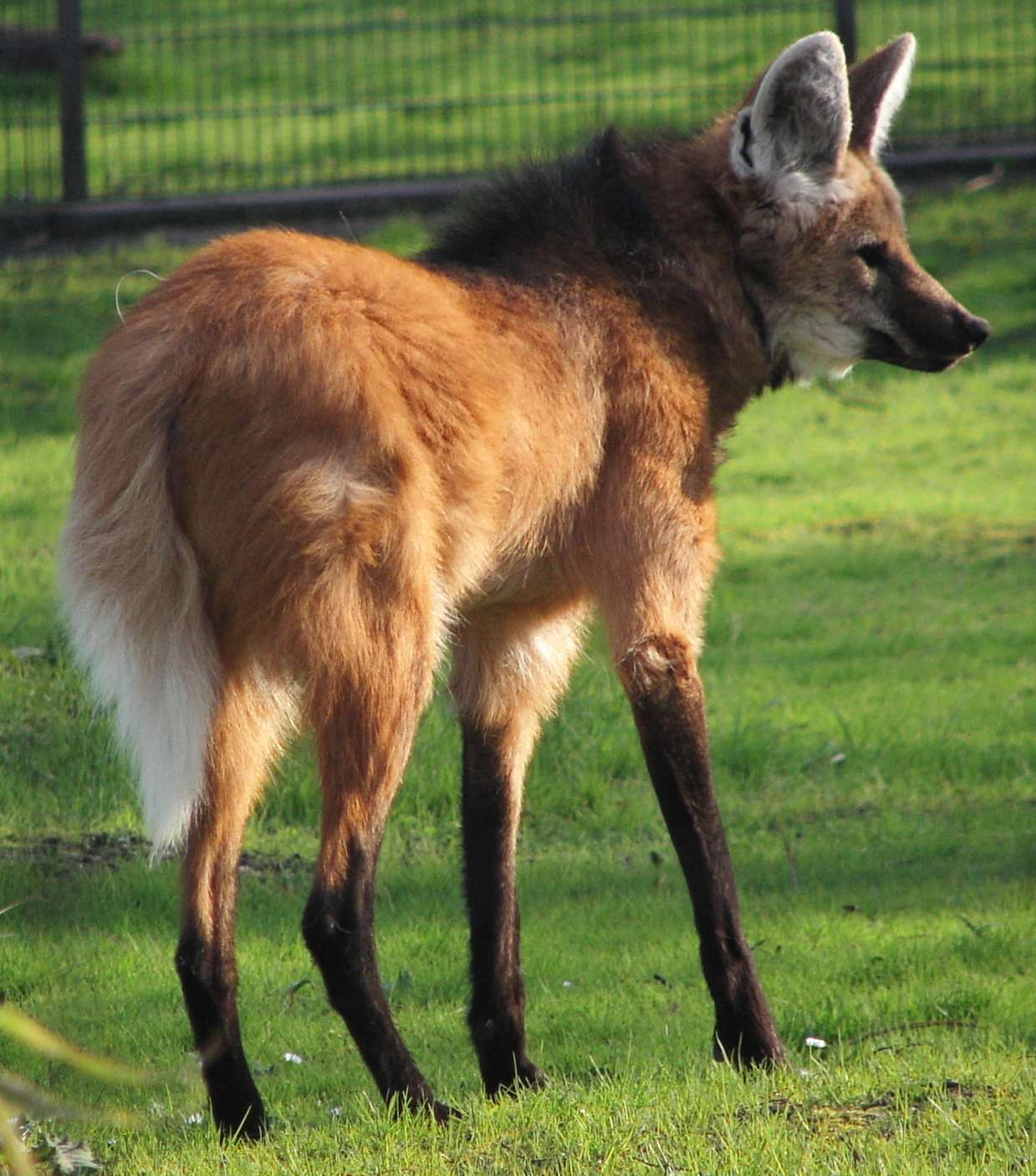
Maned wolf

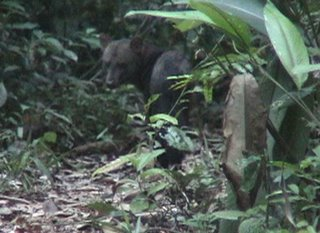
Short-eared dog

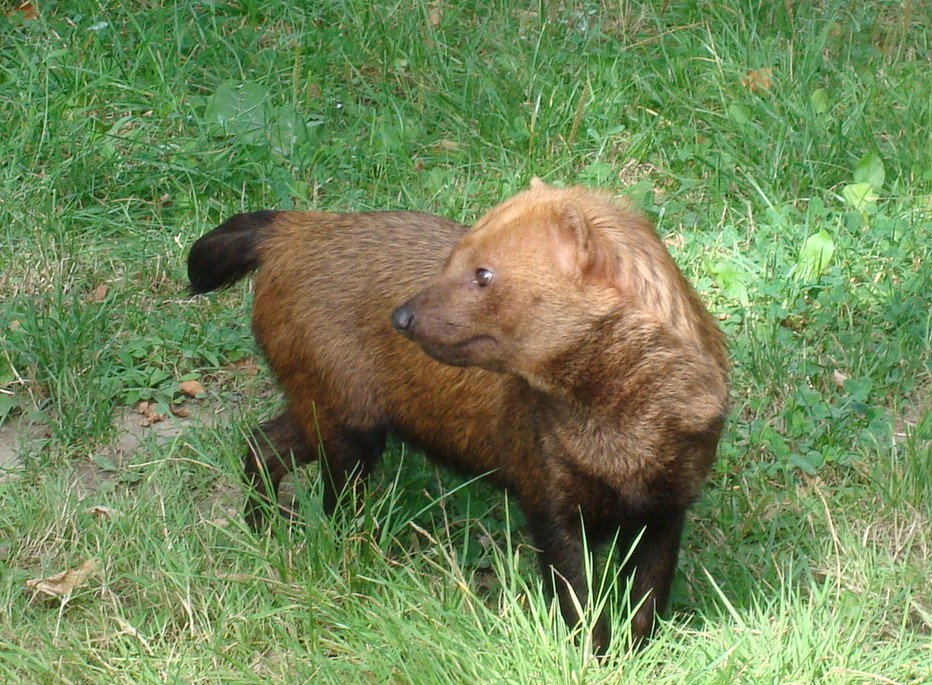
Bush dog

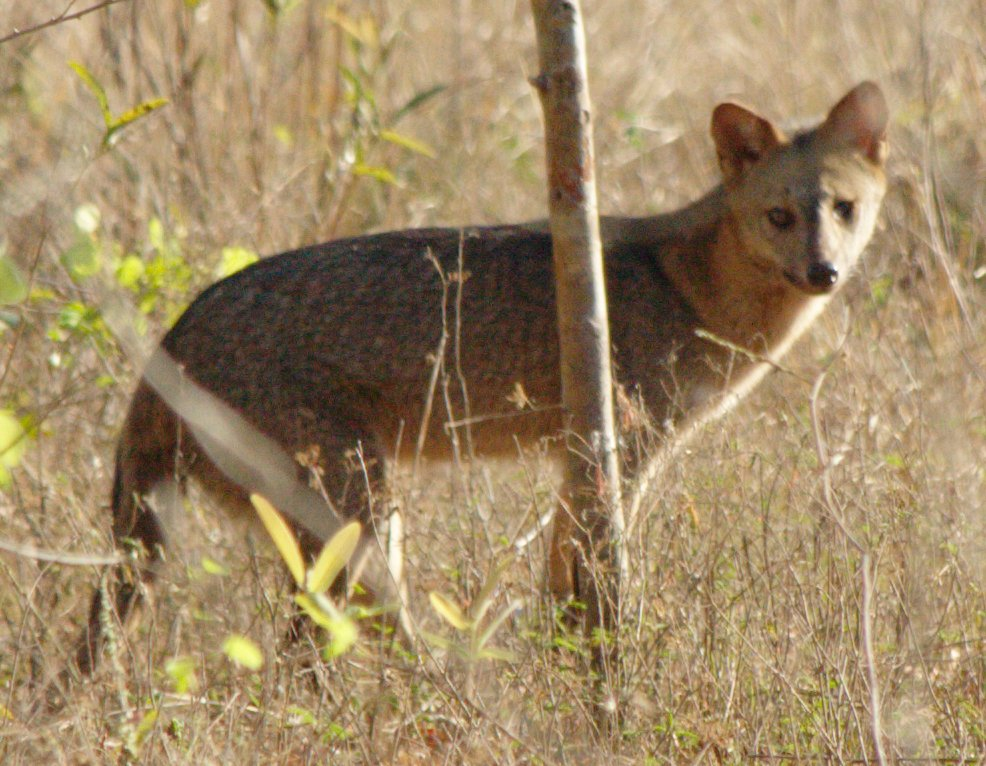
Crab-eating fox

==== Canidae - dogs, foxes, wolves ====
- Genus: Atelocynus
  - Short-eared dog, A. microtis NT
- Genus: Cerdocyon
  - Crab-eating fox, C. thousLC
- Genus: Chrysocyon
  - Maned wolf, C. brachyurus NT
- Genus: Dusicyon
  - Dusicyon avus EX
- Genus: Lycalopex
  - Pampas fox, L. gymnocercus LC
  - Hoary fox, L. vetulus NT
- Genus: Speothos
  - Bush dog, S. venaticus NT

==== Felidae - cats ====
Jaguar

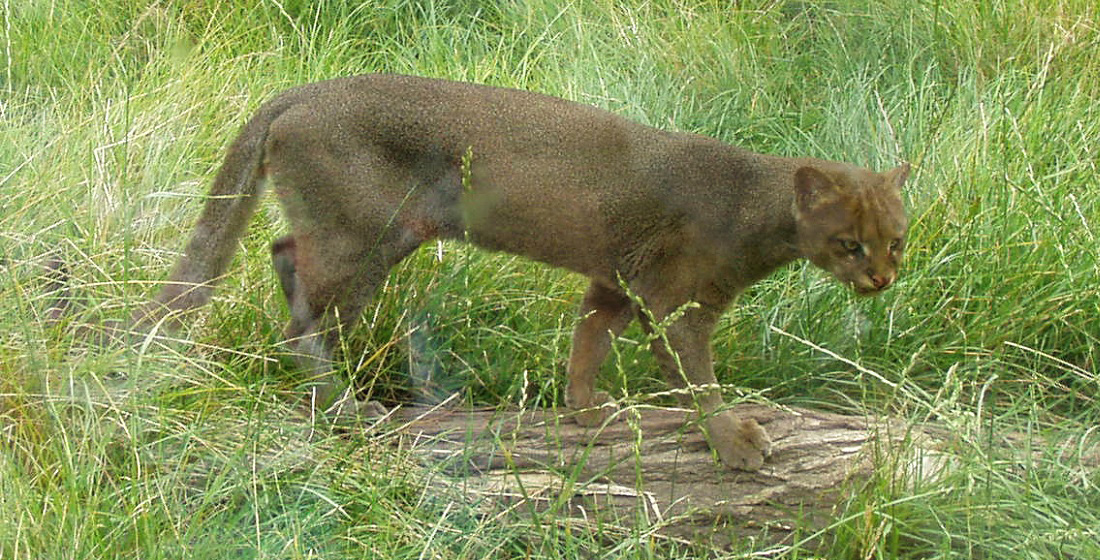
Jaguarundi

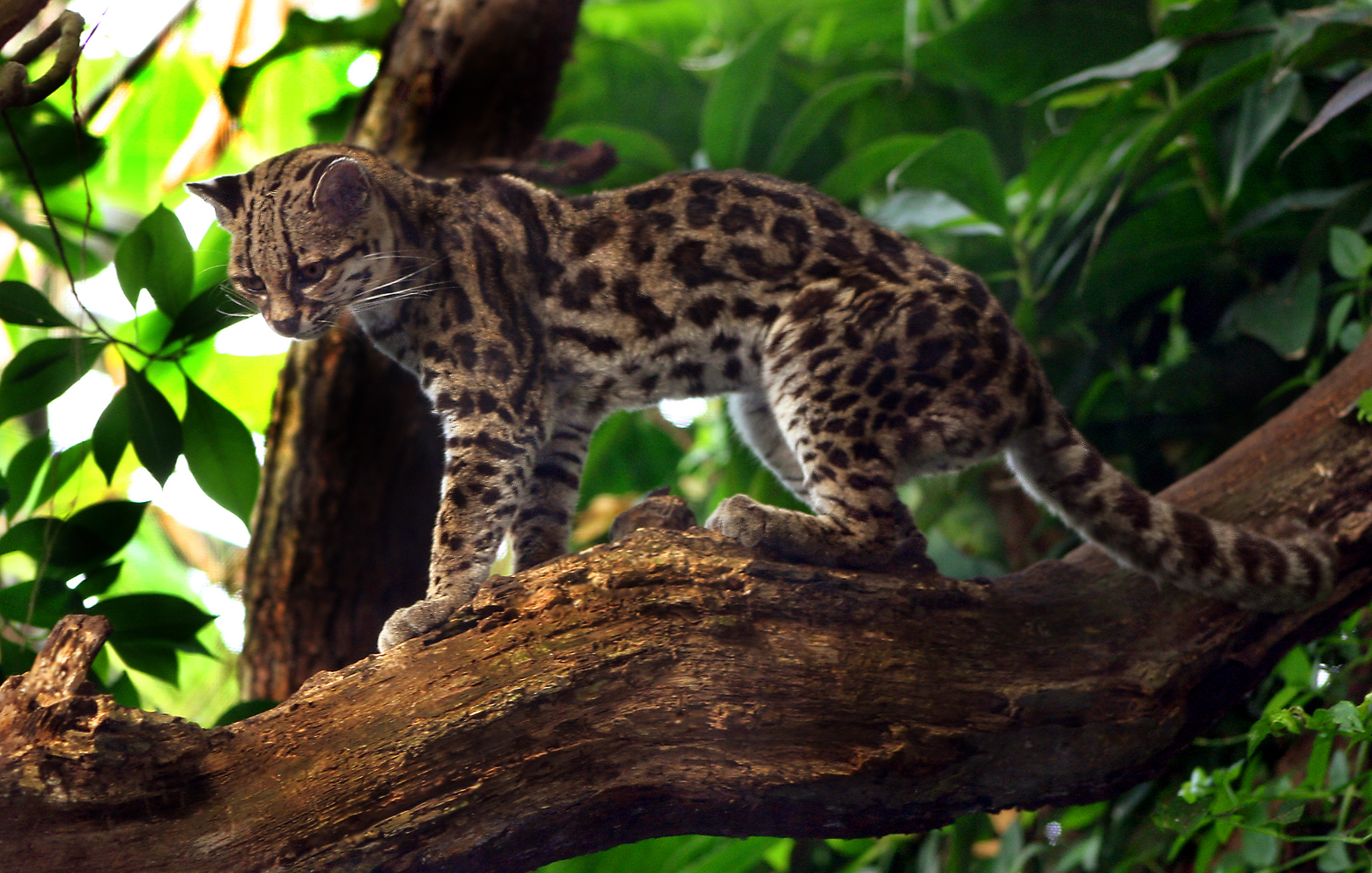
Margay

- Genus: Leopardus
  - Pampas cat L. colocolo NT
  - Geoffroy's cat L. geoffroyi LC
  - Ocelot L. pardalis LC
  - Oncilla L. tigrinus VU
  - Margay L. wiedii NT
- Genus: Herpailurus
  - Jaguarundi, H. yagouaroundi LC
- Genus: Puma
  - Cougar, P. concolor LC
- Genus: Panthera
  - Jaguar, P. onca NT

==== Mustelidae - otters, weasels and allies ====
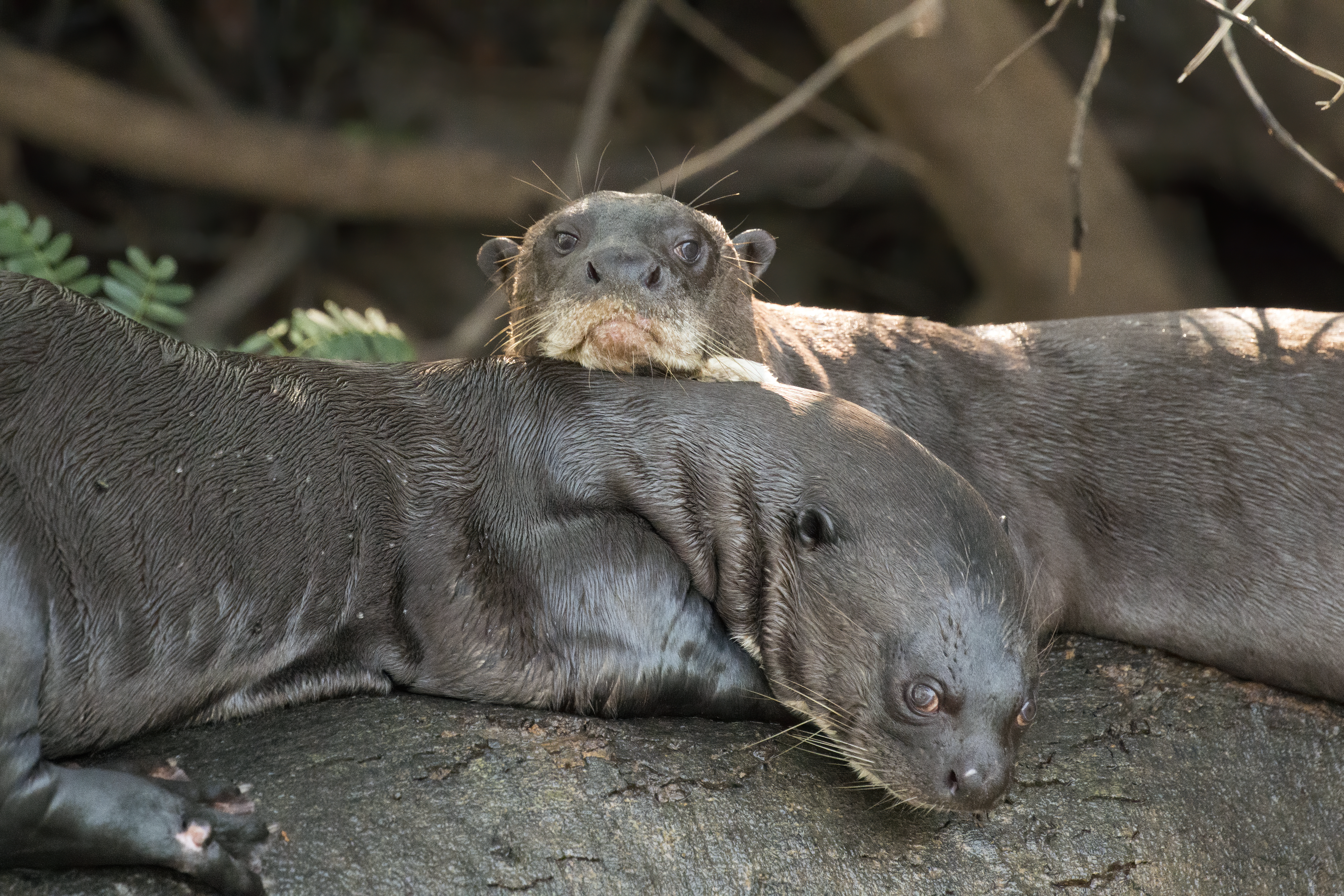
Giant otters in Mato Grosso do Sul

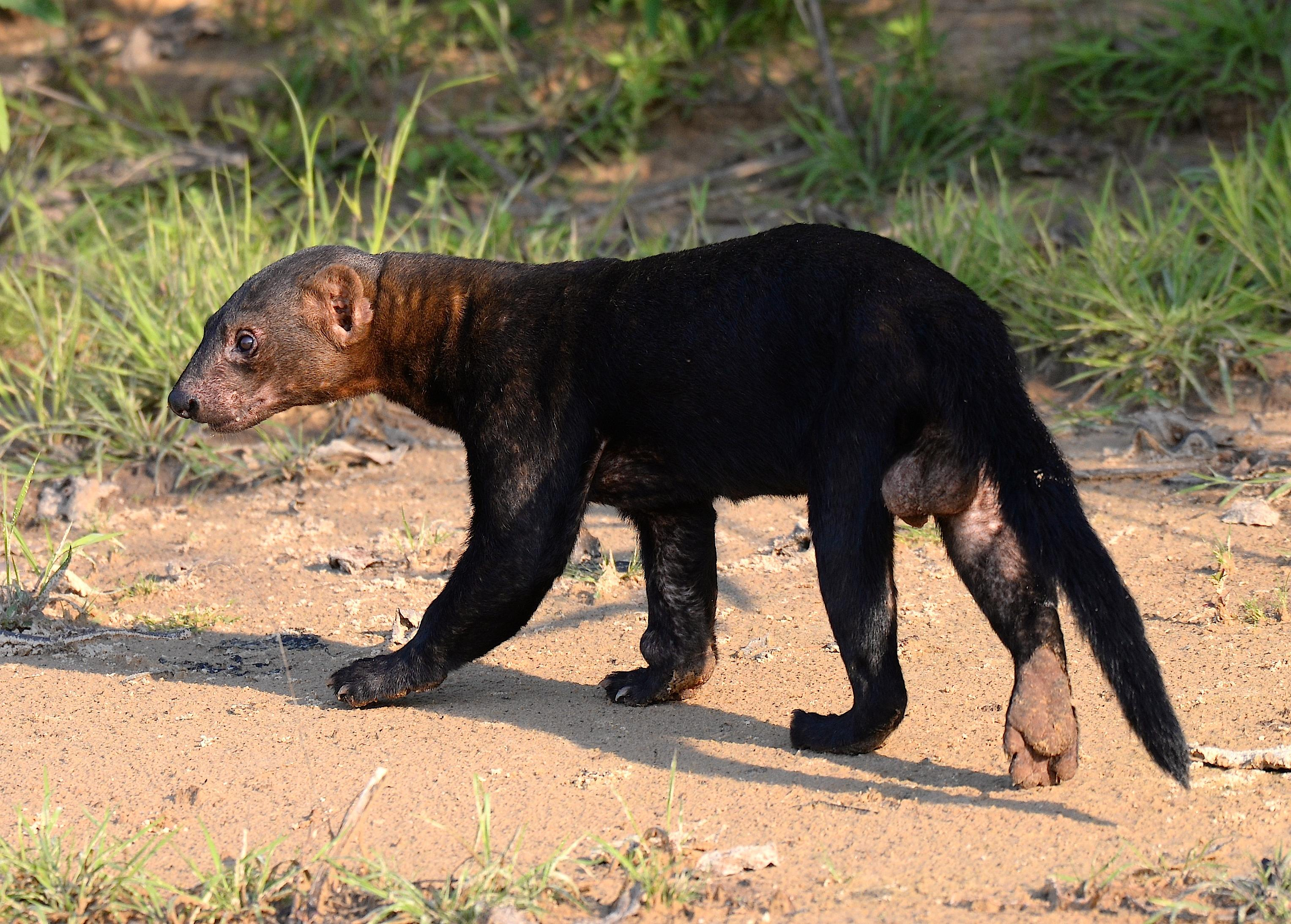
Tayra

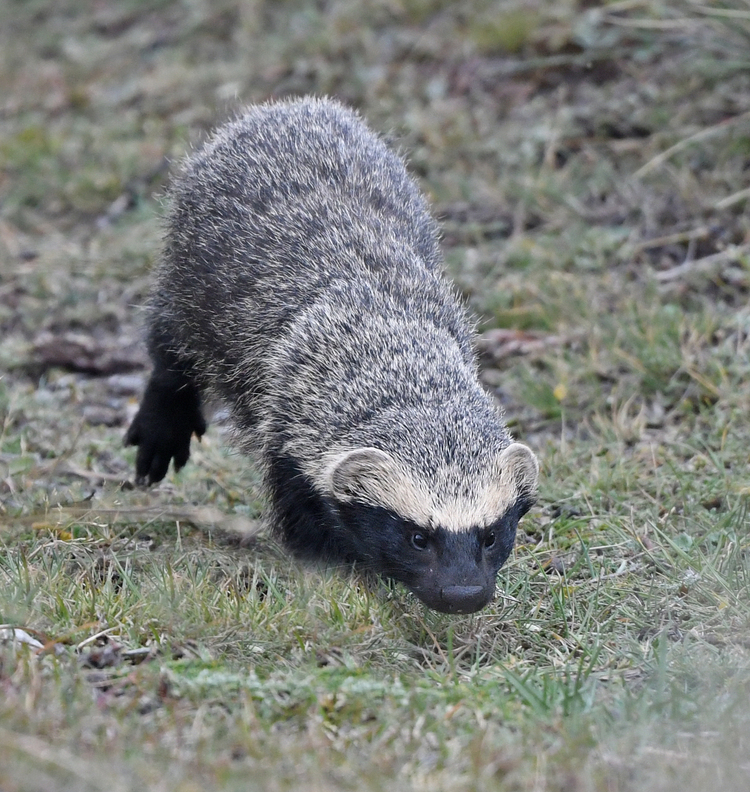
Lesser grison

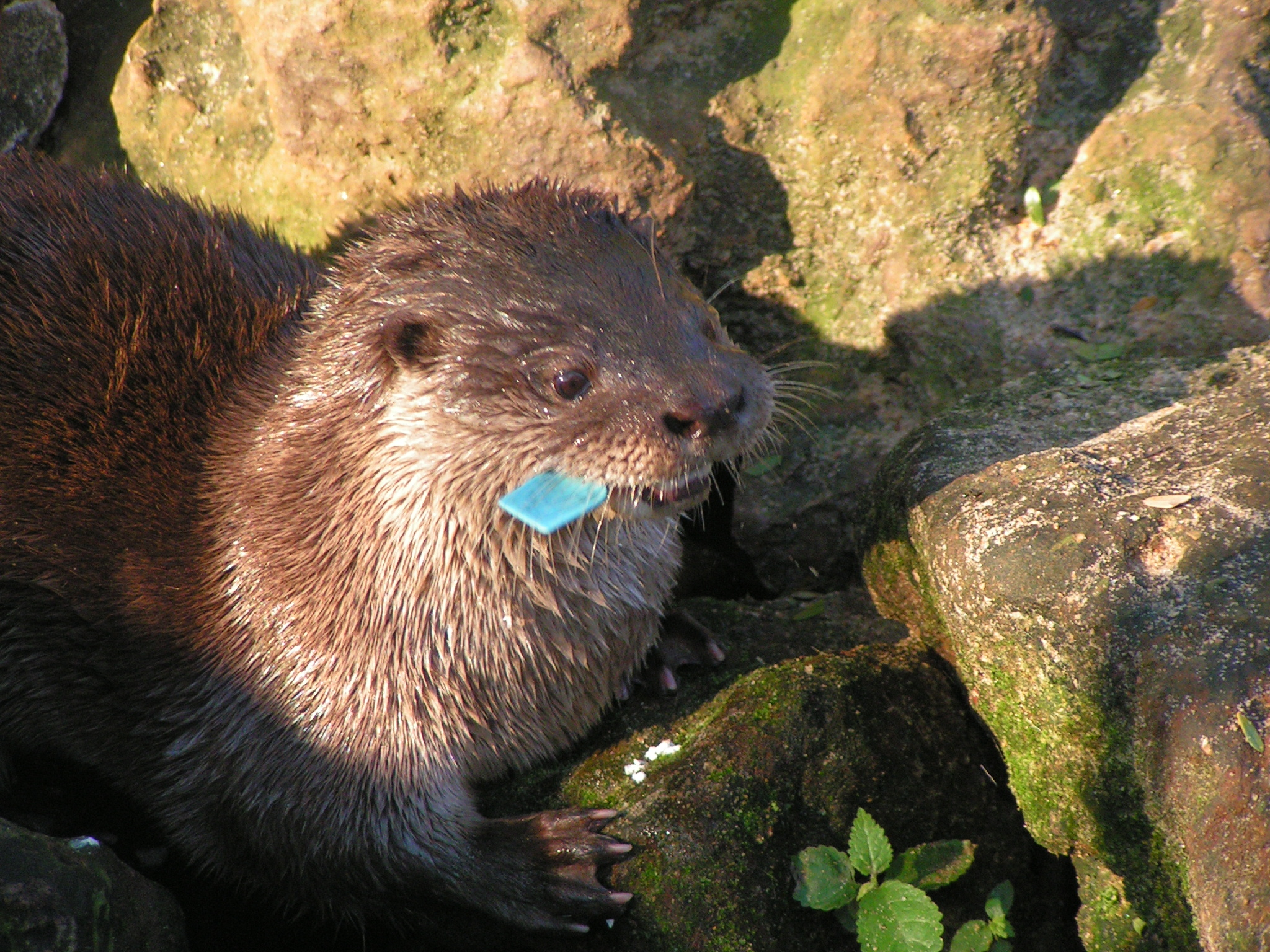
Neotropical river otter

- Tayra, Eira barbara
- Lesser grison, Galictis cuja
- Greater grison, Galictis vittata
- Neotropical river otter, Lontra longicaudis
- Amazon weasel, Neogale africana
- Long-tailed weasel, Neogale frenata
- Giant otter, Pteronura brasiliensis

==== Mephitidae - skunks ====
- Molina's hog-nosed skunk, Conepatus chinga
- Striped hog-nosed skunk, Conepatus semistriatus

==== Otariidae - eared seals ====
- South American fur seal, Arctocephalus australis LC
- Subantarctic fur seal, Arctocephalus tropicalis (vagrant) LC
- South American sea lion, Otaria flavescens LC

==== Phocidae - earless seals ====
- Southern elephant seal, Mirounga leonina (vagrant) LC

==== Procyonidae - raccoons, coatis, olingos and allies ====
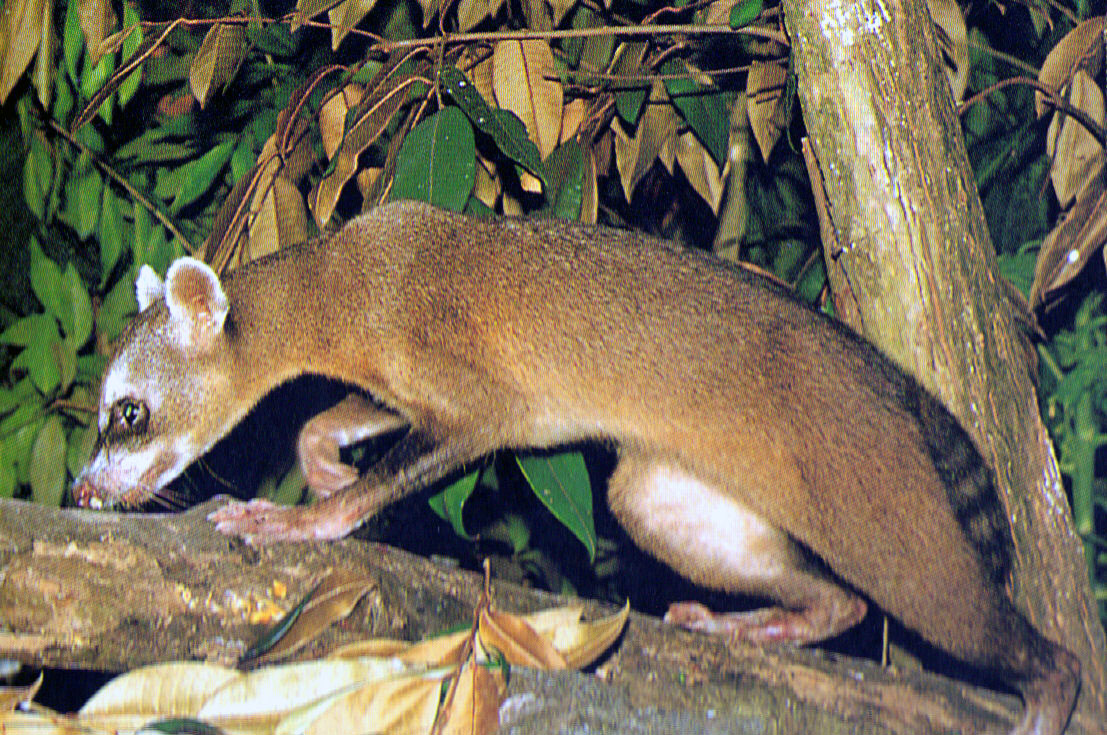
Crab-eating raccoon

- Eastern lowland olingo, Bassaricyon beddardi
- South American coati, Nasua nasua
- Kinkajou, Potos flavus
- Crab-eating raccoon, Procyon cancrivorus

=== Cetacea ===
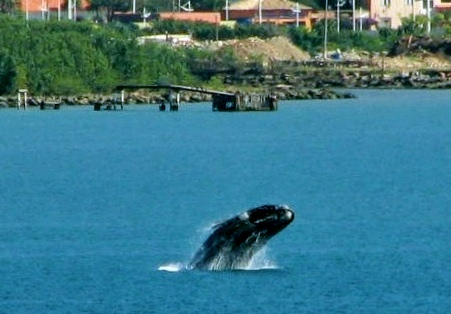
Southern right whale breaching

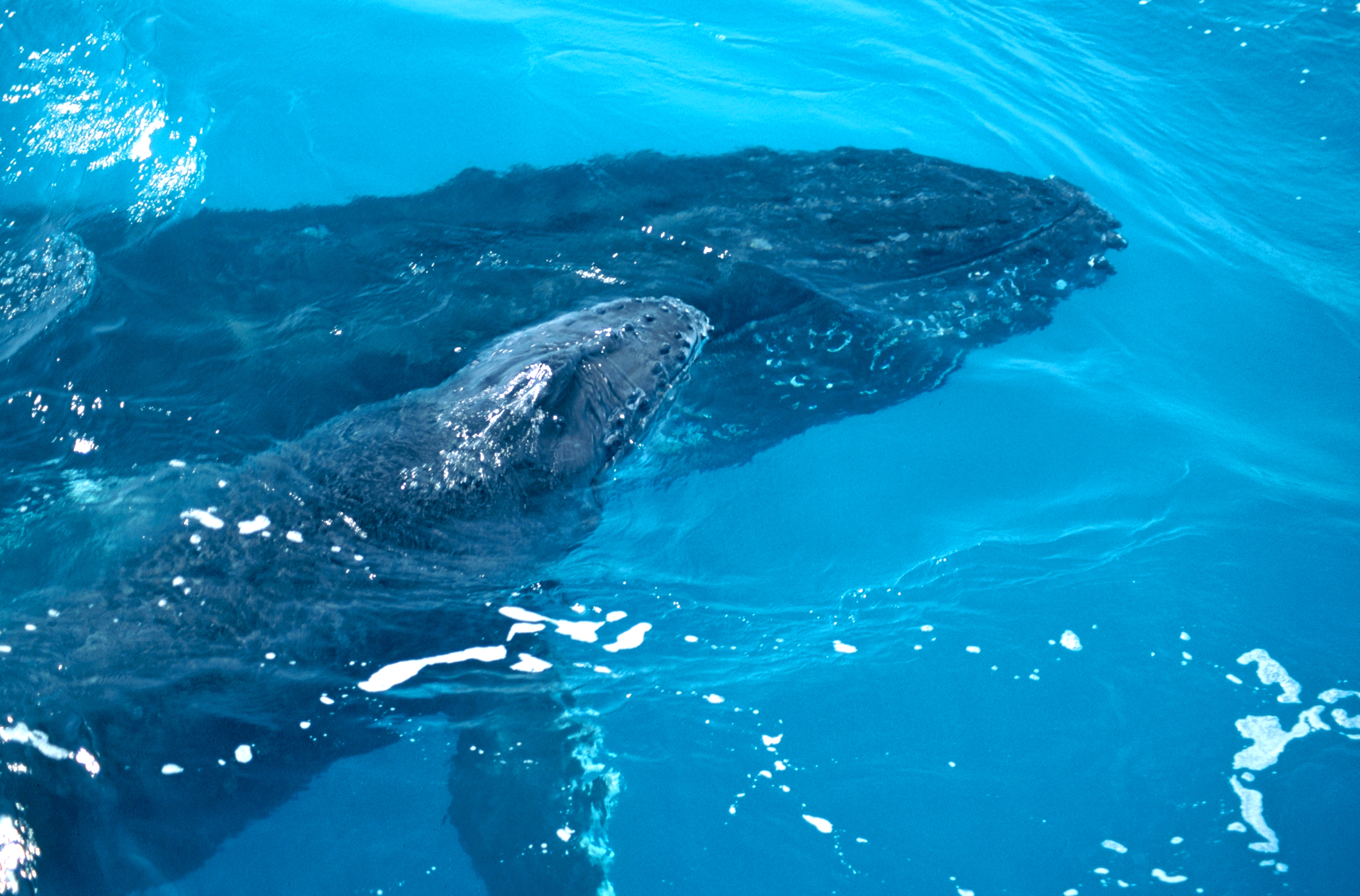
Humpback whales in Abrolhos Islands

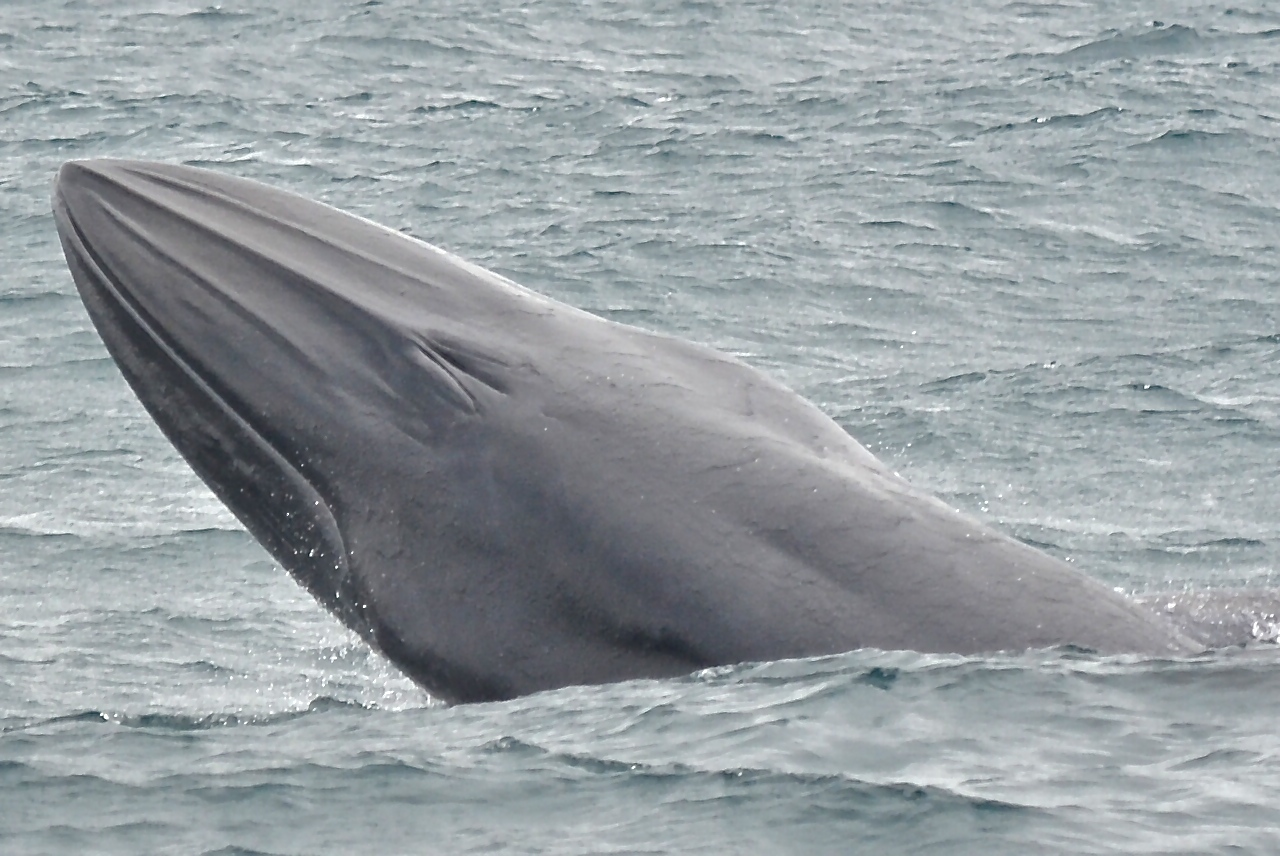
Eden's whale off Ilhabela, São Paulo

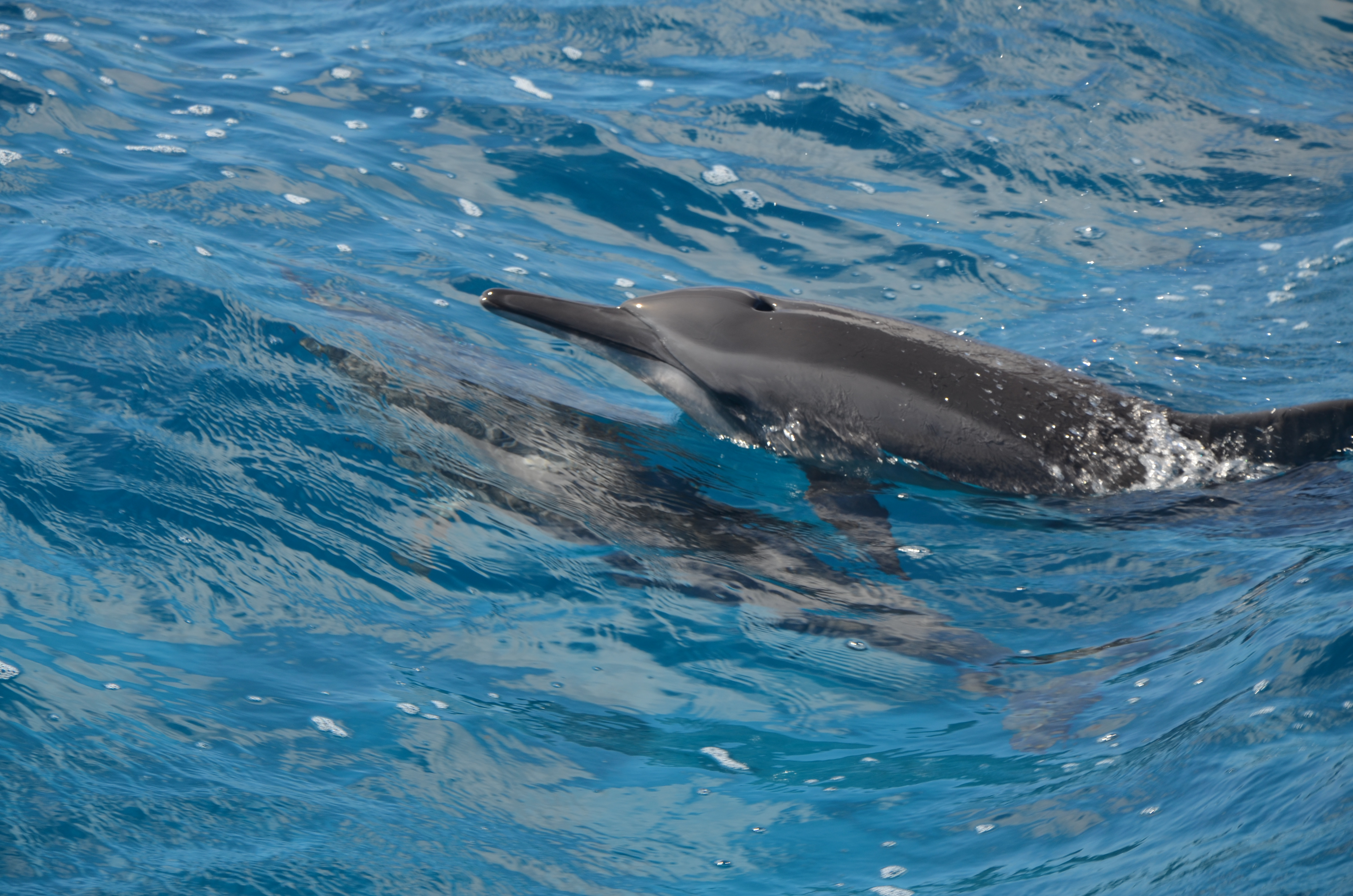
Spinner dolphins around Fernando de Noronha

==== Balaenidae - right whales ====
- Southern right whale, Eubalaena australis

==== Balaenopteridae - rorquals ====
- Common minke whale, Balaenoptera acutorostrata
- Antarctic minke whale, Balaenoptera bonaerensis
- Sei whale, Balaenoptera borealis
- Bryde's whale, Balaenoptera brydei
- Omura's whale, Balaenoptera omurai (the second case found in Atlantic oceans)
- Blue whale, Balaenoptera musculus
- Fin whale, Balaenoptera physalus
- Humpback whale, Megaptera novaeangliae

==== Delphinidae - dolphins ====
- Long-beaked common dolphin, Delphinus capensis
- Pygmy killer whale, Feresa attenuata
- Short-finned pilot whale, Globicephala macrorhynchus
- Long-finned pilot whale, Globicephala melas
- Risso's dolphin, Grampus griseus
- Fraser's dolphin, Lagenodelphis hosei
- Southern right whale dolphin, Lissodelphis peronii
- Killer whale, Orcinus orca
- Melon-headed whale, Peponocephala electra
- False killer whale, Pseudorca crassidens
- Costero, Sotalia guianensis
- Tucuxi, Sotalia fluviatilis
- Pantropical spotted dolphin, Stenella attenuata
- Clymene dolphin, Stenella clymene
- Striped dolphin, Stenella coeruleoalba
- Spinner dolphin, Stenella longirostris
- Rough-toothed dolphin, Steno bredanensis
- Common bottlenose dolphin, Tursiops truncatus

==== Phocoenidae - porpoises ====
- Burmeister's porpoise, Phocoena spinipinnis
- Spectacled porpoise, Phocoena dioptrica

==== Physeteridae ====
- Sperm whale, Physeter macrocephalus VU

==== Iniidae - South American river dolphins ====
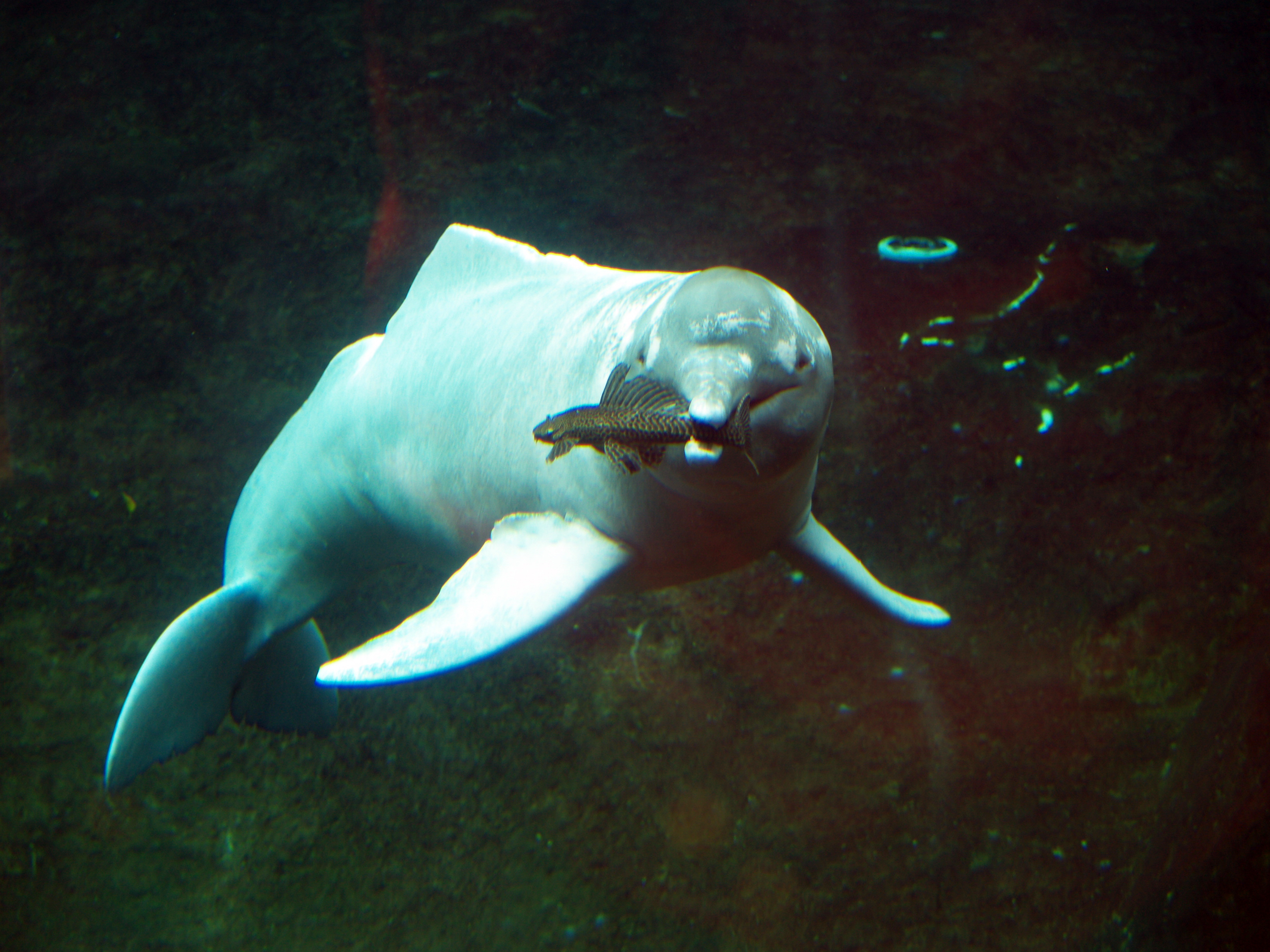
Amazon river dolphin

- Amazon river dolphin, Inia geoffrensis
- Araguaian river dolphin, Inia araguaiaensis

==== Pontoporiidae - La Plata dolphin ====
- La Plata dolphin, Pontoporia blainvillei

==== Ziphiidae - beaked whales ====
- Arnoux's beaked whale, Berardius arnuxii
- Southern bottlenose whale, Hyperoodon planifrons
- Blainville's beaked whale, Mesoplodon densirostris
- Hector's beaked whale, Mesoplodon hectori
- Cuvier's beaked whale, Ziphius cavirostris

=== Sirenia ===
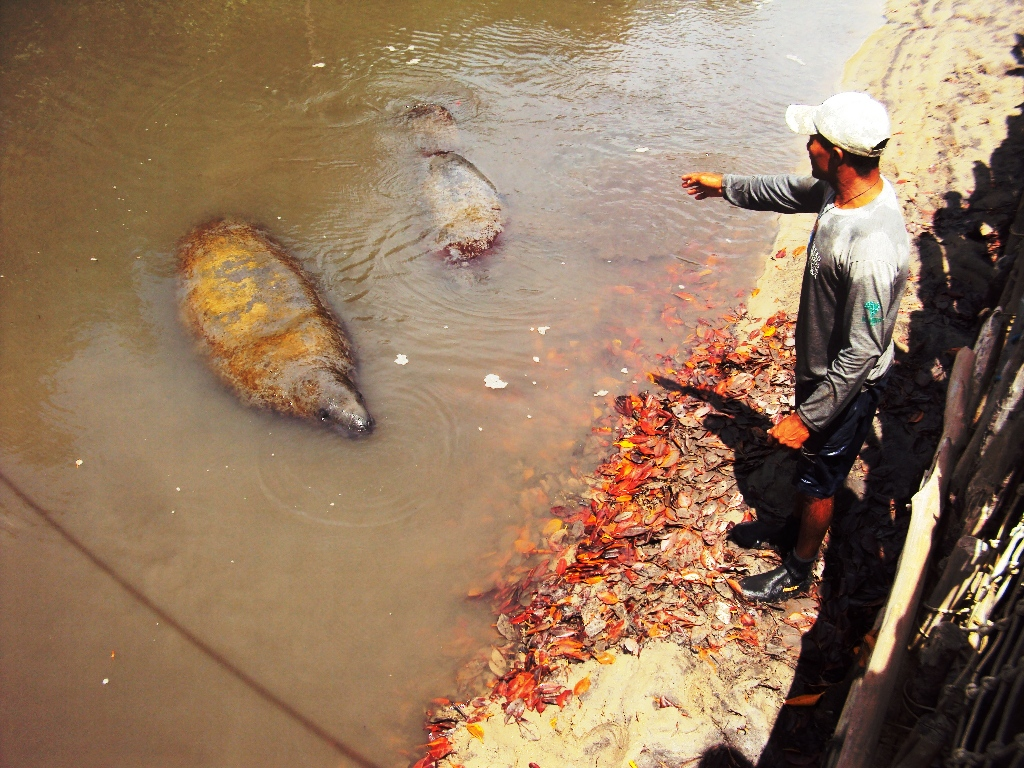
West Indian manatees in Peixe-boi Project, Paraíba

==== Trichechidae - manatees ====
- Amazonian manatee, Trichechus inunguis VU
- West Indian manatee, Trichechus manatus VU
- Dwarf manatee, Trichechus pygmaeus (disputed species status)

=== Perissodactyla ===
==== Tapiridae - tapirs ====
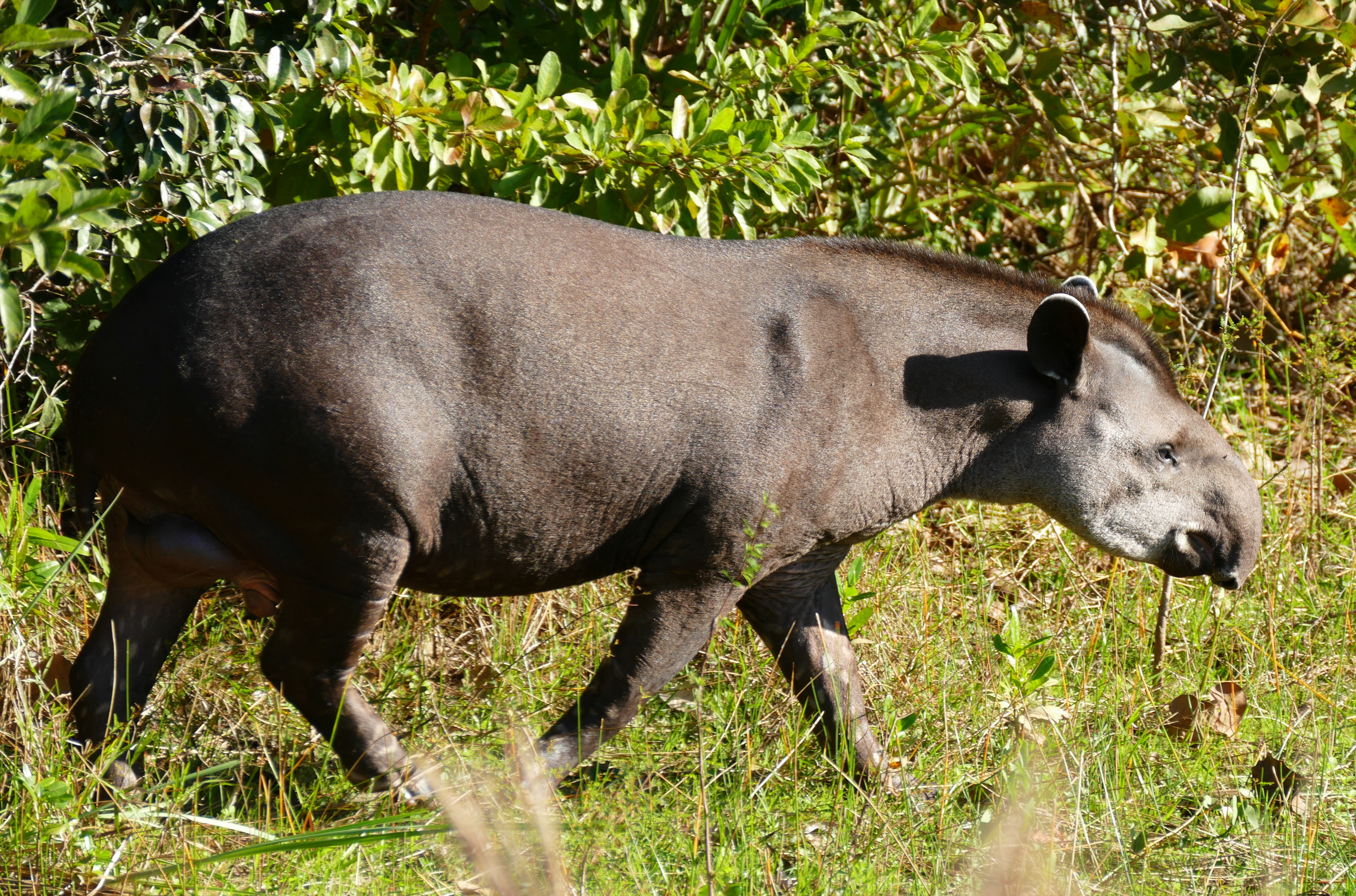
Brazilian tapir

- Brazilian tapir, Tapirus terrestris
- Kabomani tapir, Tapirus kabomani

=== Artiodactyla ===
==== Suidae - pigs ====
- Feral hog, Sus scrofa (introduced species)

==== Tayassuidae - peccaries ====
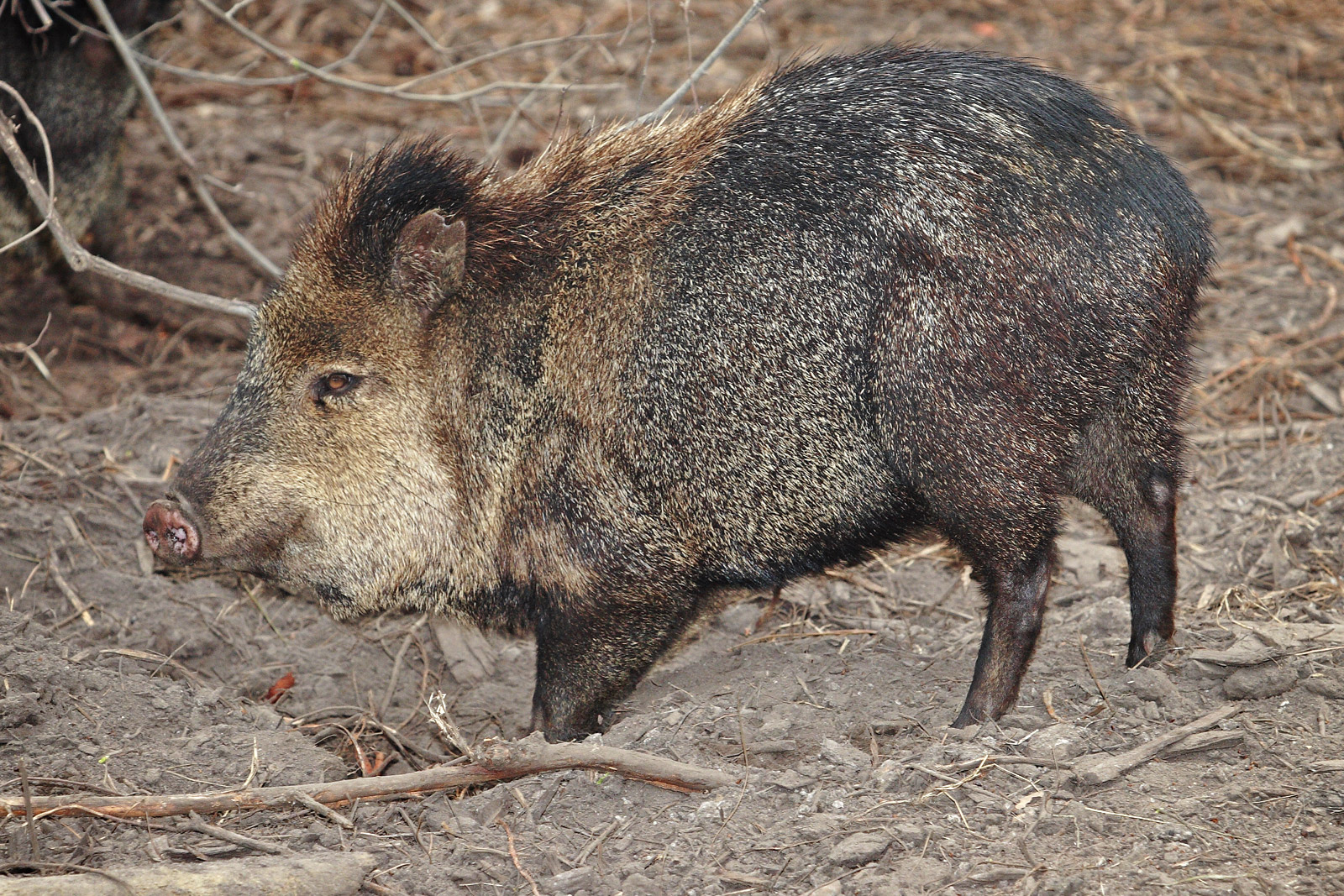
Collared peccary

- Collared peccary, Dicotyles tajacu
- Giant peccary, Pecari maximus
- White-lipped peccary, Tayassu pecari

==== Cervidae - deer ====
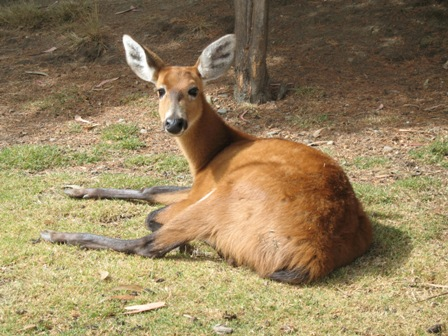
Marsh deer

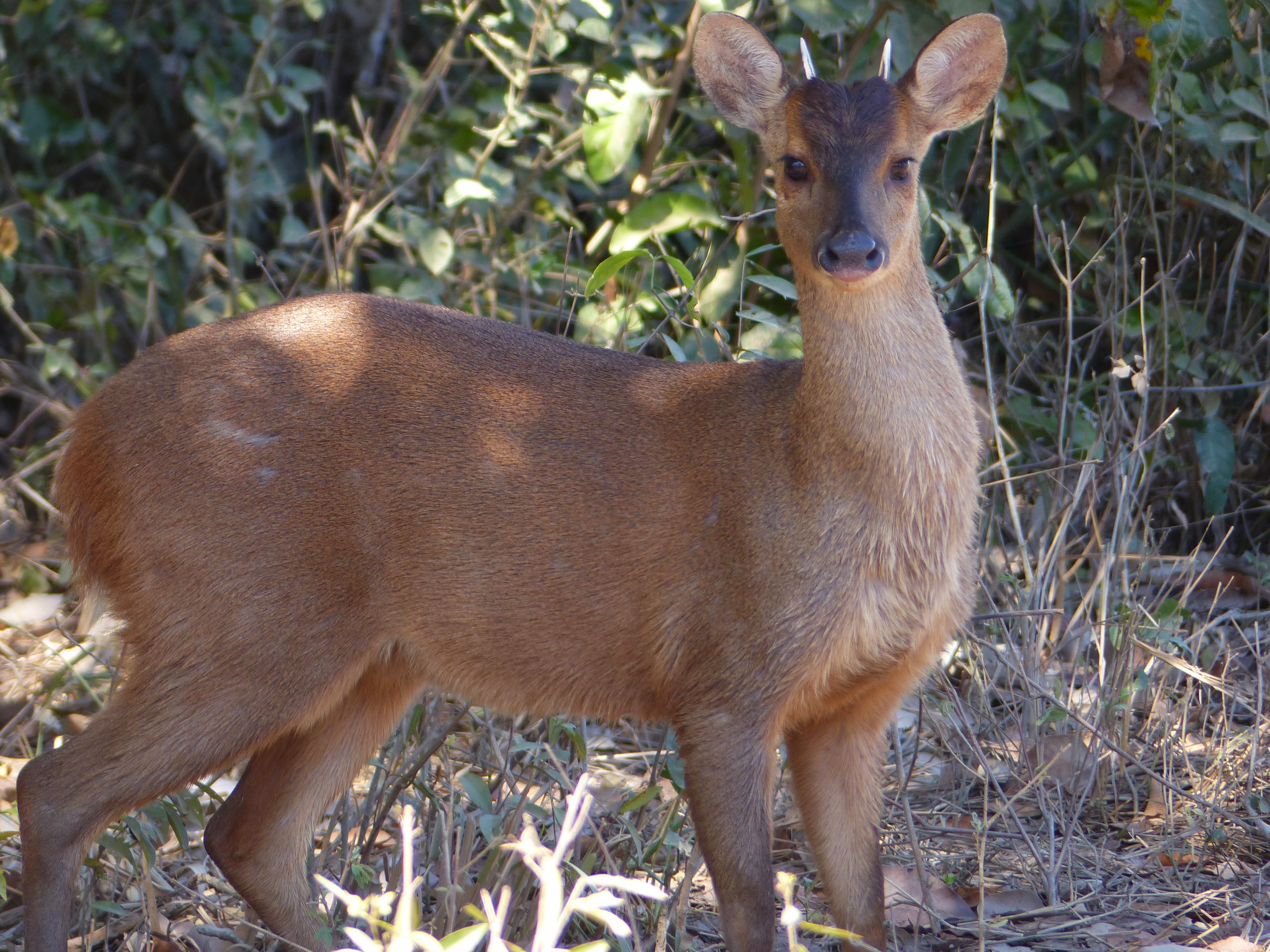
Red brocket

- Chital or axis deer, Axis axis (introduced species)
- Marsh deer, Blastocerus dichotomus
- Red brocket, Mazama americana
- Gray brocket, Mazama gouazoubira
- Pygmy brocket, Mazama nana
- White-tailed deer, Odocoileus virginianus
- Pampas deer, Ozotoceros bezoarticus

=== Rodentia ===
==== Sciuridae - squirrels ====
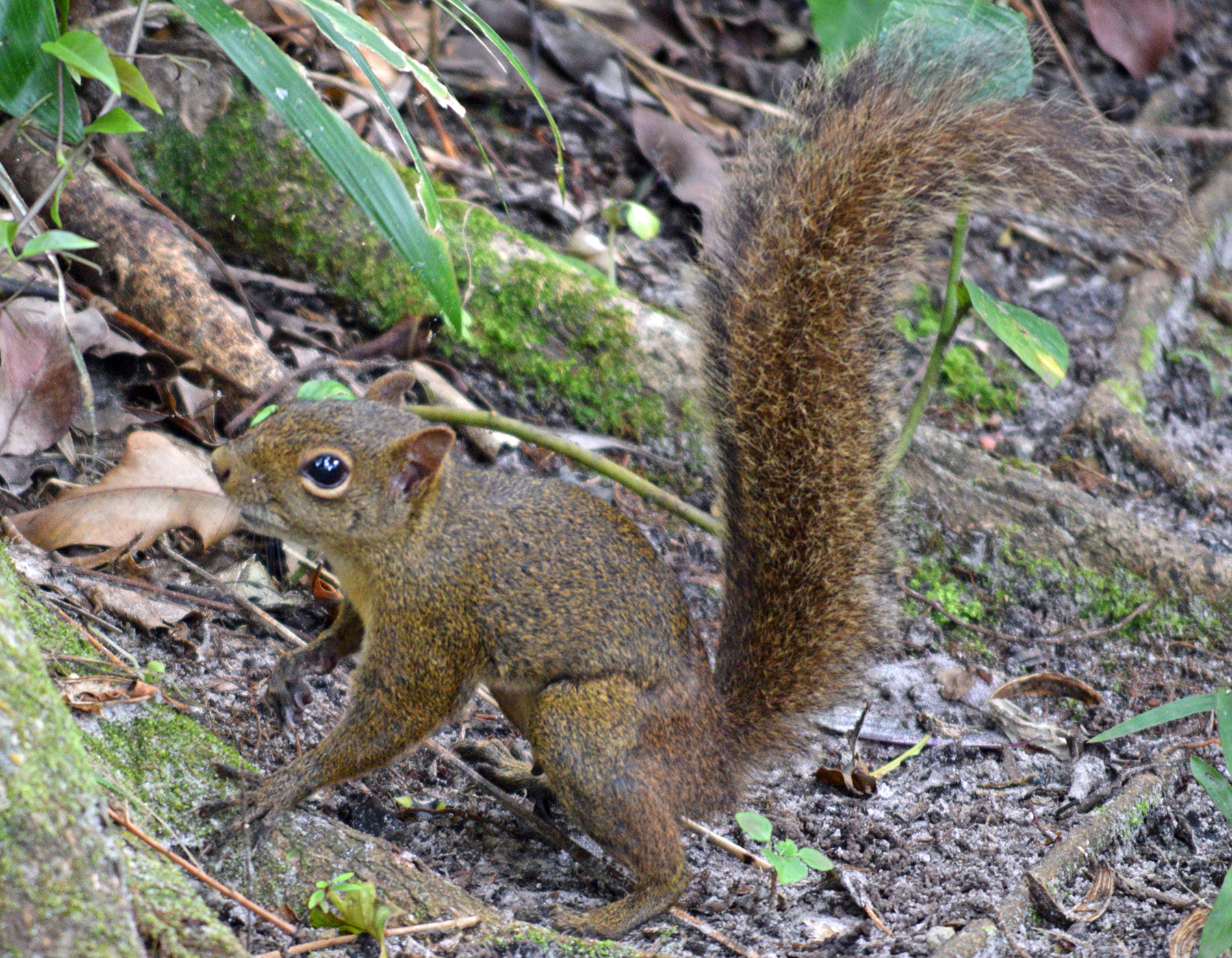
Brazilian squirrel

- Amazon dwarf squirrel, Microsciurus flaviventer
- Neotropical pygmy squirrel, Sciurillus pusillus
- Brazilian squirrel, Sciurus aestuans
- Yellow-throated squirrel, Sciurus gilvigularis
- Bolivian squirrel, Sciurus ignitus
- Northern Amazon red squirrel, Sciurus igniventris
- Southern Amazon red squirrel, Sciurus spadiceus

==== Myocastoridae ====
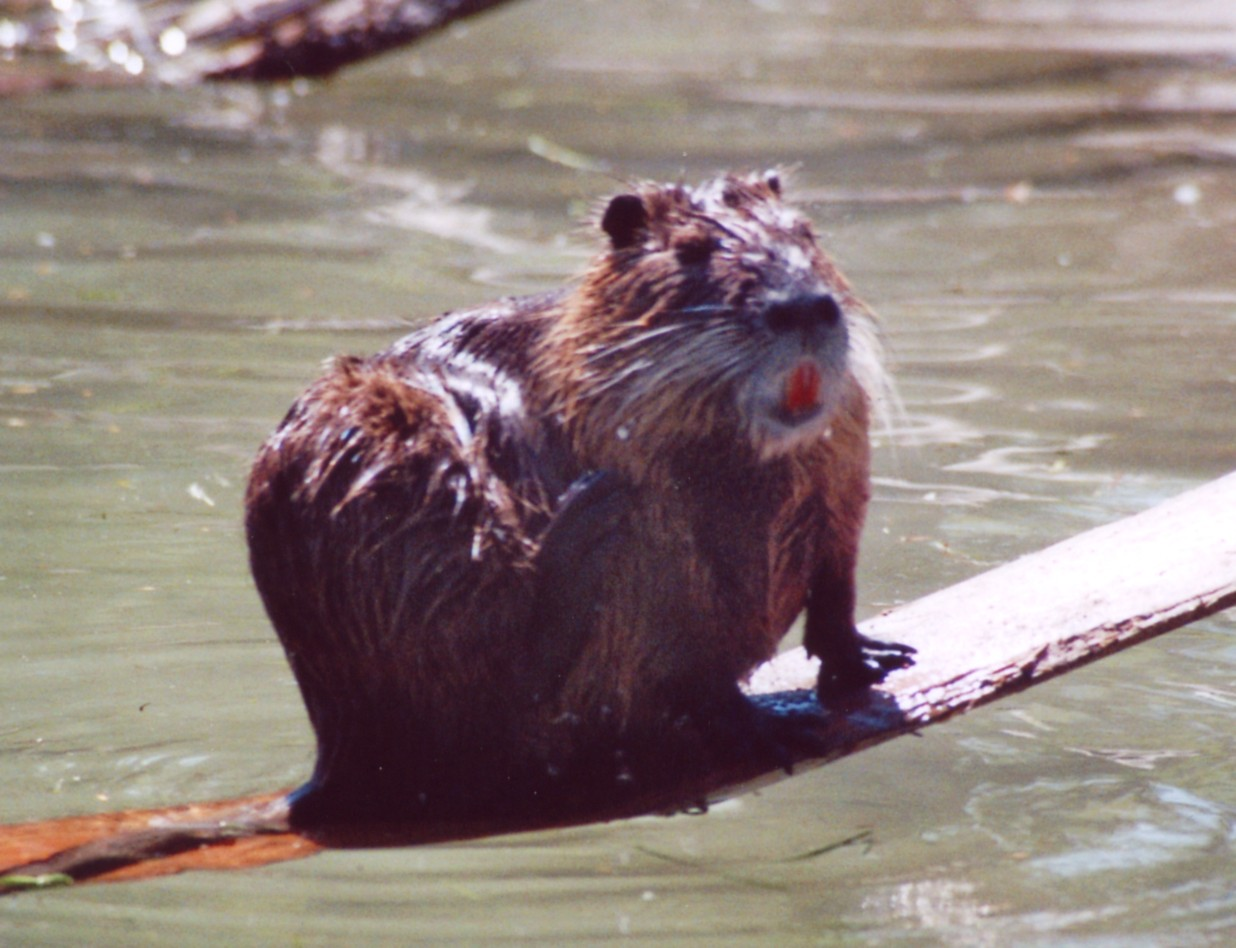
Nutria

- Nutria, Myocastor coypus

==== Muridae - Old World rats and allies ====
- Norway rat, Rattus norvegicus (introduced species)
- Black rat, Rattus rattus (introduced species)
- House mouse, Mus musculus (introduced species)

==== Cricetidae - New World rats and allies ====
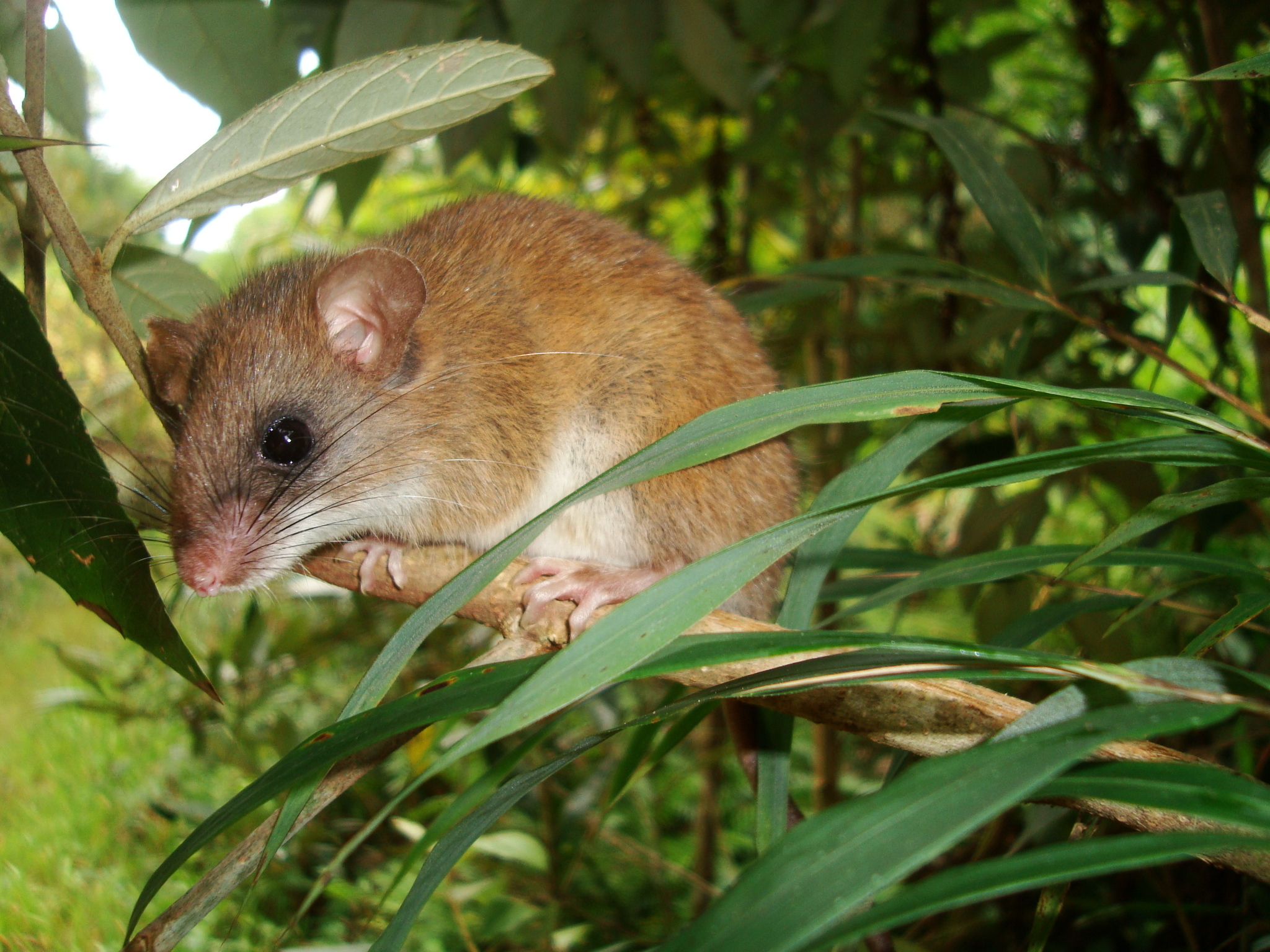
Drymoreomys albimaculatus

- Abrawayaomys chebezi
- Ruschi's rat, Abrawayaomys ruschii
- Azara's grass mouse, Akodon azarae
- Cursor grass mouse, Akodon cursor
- Lindbergh's grass mouse, Akodon lindberghi
- Montane grass mouse, Akodon montensis
- Caparaó grass mouse, Akodon mystax
- Paraná grass mouse, Akodon paranaensis
- Reig's grass mouse, Akodon reigi
- Sao Paulo grass mouse, Akodon sanctipaulensis
- Serra do Mar grass mouse, Akodon serrensis
- Large-lipped crimson-nosed rat, Bibimys labiosus
- Brazilian shrew mouse, Blarinomys breviceps
- Gray-bellied brucie, Brucepattersonius griserufescens
- Red-bellied brucie, Brucepattersonius igniventris
- Ihering's hocicudo, Brucepattersonius iheringi
- Soricine brucie, Brucepattersonius soricinus
- Large vesper mouse, Calomys callosus
- Calomys cerqueirai
- Small vesper mouse, Calomys laucha
- Delicate vesper mouse, Calomys tener
- Tocantins vesper mouse, Calomys tocantinsi
- Cerradomys langguthi
- Cerradomys maracajuensis
- Marinho's oryzomys, Cerradomys marinhus
- Lindbergh's oryzomys, Cerradomys scotti
- Terraced rice rat, Cerradomys subflavus
- Cerradomys vivoi
- Montane Atlantic Forest rat, Delomys collinus
- Striped Atlantic Forest rat, Delomys dorsalis
- Pallid Atlantic Forest rat, Delomys sublineatus
- Drymoreomys albimaculatus
- Emmons's rice rat, Euryoryzomys emmonsae
- Buffy-sided oryzomys, Euryoryzomys lamia
- MacConnell's rice rat, Euryoryzomys macconnelli
- Elegant rice rat, Euryoryzomys nitidus
- Russet rice rat, Euryoryzomys russatus
- Gray leaf-eared mouse, Graomys griseoflavus
- Web-footed marsh rat, Holochilus brasiliensis
- Amazonian marsh rat, Holochilus sciureus
- Atlantic Forest oryzomys, Hylaeamys laticeps
- Azara's broad-headed oryzomys, Hylaeamys megacephalus
- Sowbug rice rat, Hylaeamys oniscus
- Western Amazonian oryzomys, Hylaeamys perenensis
- Yungas rice rat, Hylaeamys yunganus
- Juliomys anoblepas (extinct)
- Juliomys ossitenuis
- Lesser Wilfred's mouse, Juliomys pictipes
- Cleft-headed juliomys, Juliomys rimofrons
- Aracuaria Forest tree mouse, Juliomys ximenezi
- Juscelinomys candango (extinct)
- Juscelinomys talpinus
- Molelike mouse, Juscelinomys vulpinus
- Woolly giant rat, Kunsia tomentosus
- Lund's amphibious rat, Lundomys molitor
- Transitional colilargo, Microakodontomys transitorius
- Dubost's bristly mouse, Neacomys dubosti
- Guiana bristly mouse, Neacomys guianae
- Jurua bristly mouse, Neacomys minutus
- Musser's neacomys, Neacomys musseri
- Paracou neacomys, Neacomys paracou
- Common neacomys, Neacomys spinosus
- Narrow-footed bristly mouse, Neacomys tenuipes
- Hairy-tailed bolo mouse, Necromys lasiurus
- Small-footed bristly mouse, Nectomys rattus
- Scaly-footed water rat, Nectomys squamipes
- Guianan arboreal rice rat, Oecomys auyantepui
- Bicolored arboreal rice rat, Oecomys bicolor
- Cleber's arboreal rice rat, Oecomys cleberi
- Unicolored arboreal rice rat, Oecomys concolor
- Mamore arboreal rice rat, Oecomys mamorae
- Brazilian arboreal rice rat, Oecomys paricola
- King arboreal rice rat, Oecomys rex
- Robert's arboreal rice rat, Oecomys roberti
- Trinidad arboreal rice rat, Oecomys trinitatis
- Chacoan pygmy rice rat, Oligoryzomys chacoensis
- Yellow pygmy rice rat, Oligoryzomys flavescens
- Fulvous pygmy rice rat, Oligoryzomys fulvescens
- Small-eared pygmy rice rat, Oligoryzomys microtis
- Oligoryzomys moojeni
- Black-footed pygmy rice rat, Oligoryzomys nigripes
- Oligoryzomys rupestris
- Straw-colored pygmy rice rat, Oligoryzomys stramineus
- Amazonian hocicudo, Oxymycterus amazonicus
- Angular hocicudo, Oxymycterus angularis
- Caparaó hocicudo, Oxymycterus caparaoe
- Hispid hocicudo, Oxymycterus hispidus
- Long-nosed hocicudo, Oxymycterus nasutus
- Robert's hocicudo, Oxymycterus roberti
- Red hocicudo, Oxymycterus rufus
- Rio de Janeiro arboreal rat, Phaenomys ferrugineus
- Brazilian false rice rat, Pseudoryzomys simplex
- Brazilian arboreal mouse, Rhagomys rufescens
- Gardner's climbing mouse, Rhipidomys gardneri
- White-footed climbing mouse, Rhipidomys leucodactylus
- MacConnell's climbing mouse, Rhipidomys macconnelli
- Atlantic Forest climbing mouse, Rhipidomys mastacalis
- Splendid climbing mouse, Rhipidomys nitela
- Waterhouse's swamp rat, Scapteromys tumidus
- Ucayali spiny mouse, Scolomys ucayalensis
- Alston's cotton rat, Sigmodon alstoni
- Paraguayan rice rat, Sooretamys angouya
- Cerrado mouse, Thalpomys cerradensis
- Hairy-eared cerrado mouse, Thalpomys lasiotis
- Blackish grass mouse, Thaptomys nigrita
- Cerrado red-nosed mouse, Wiedomys cerradensis
- Red-nosed mouse, Wiedomys pyrrhorhinos
- Greater Wilfred's mouse, Wilfredomys oenax
- Short-tailed cane rat, Zygodontomys brevicauda

==== Erethizontidae - New World porcupines ====
- Bristle-spined porcupine, Chaetomys subspinosus
- Bahia porcupine, Coendou insidiosus
- Black-tailed hairy dwarf porcupine, Coendou melanurus
- Black dwarf porcupine, Coendou nycthemera
- Brazilian porcupine, Coendou prehensilis
- Roosmalen's dwarf porcupine, Coendou roosmalenorum
- Paraguaian hairy dwarf porcupine, Coendou spinosus

==== Dinomyidae ====
- Pacarana, Dinomys branickii

==== Caviidae - guinea pigs and cavies ====
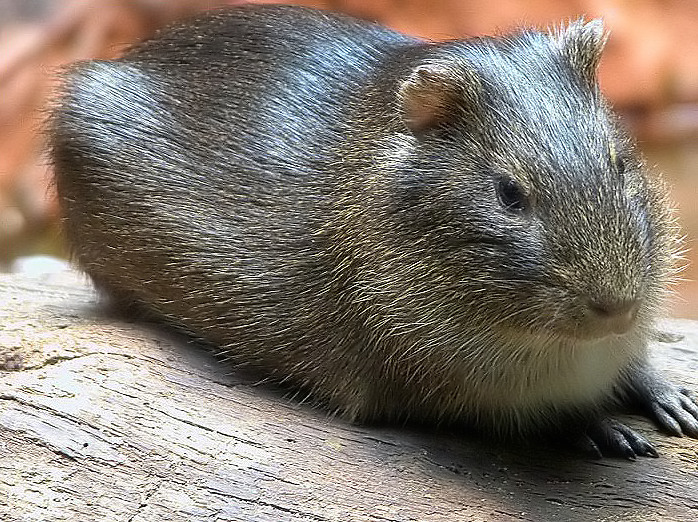
Brazilian guinea pig

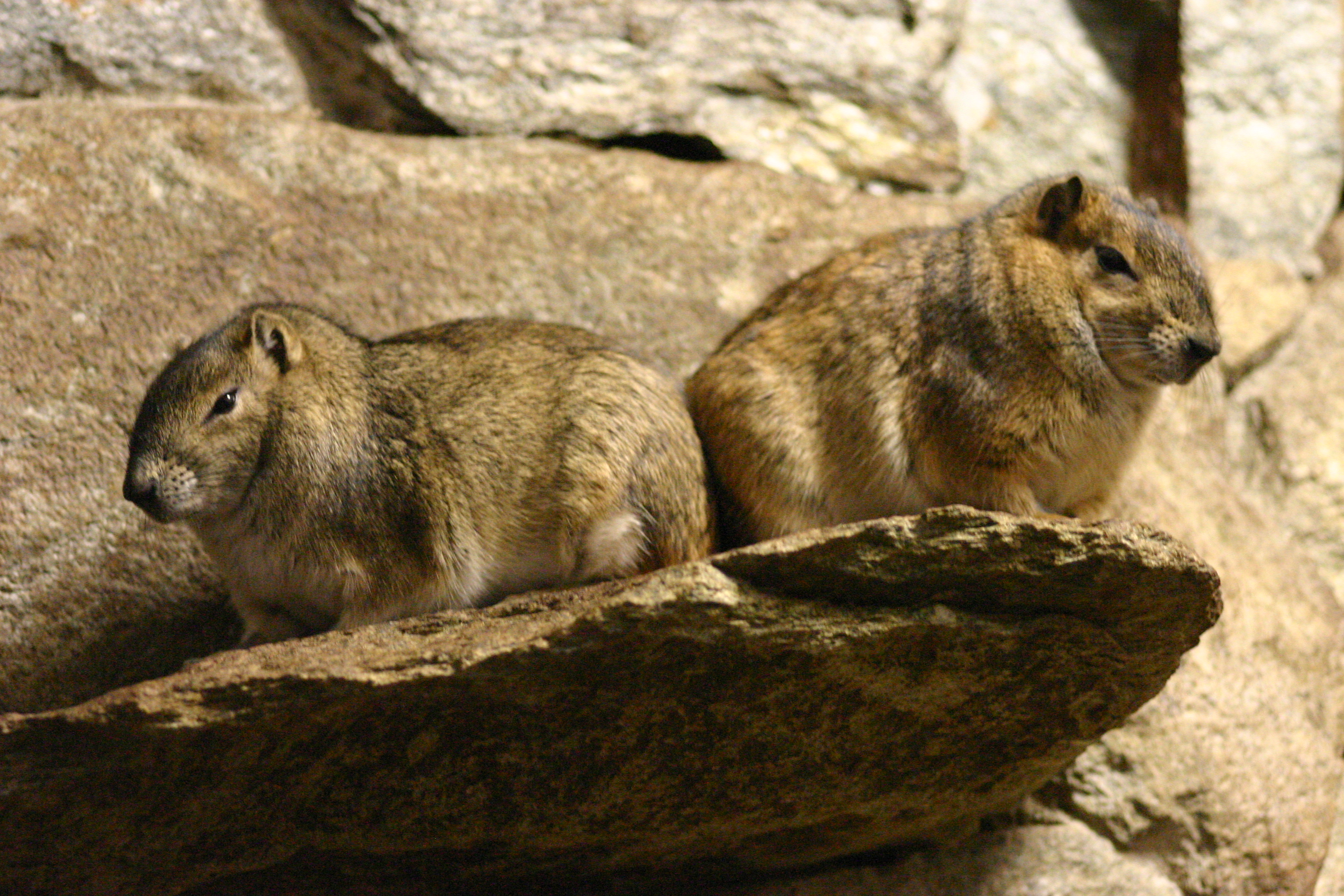
Rock cavy

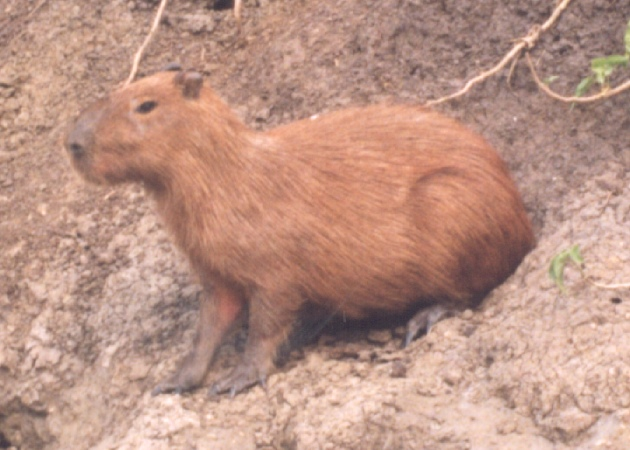
Capybara

- Brazilian guinea pig, Cavia aperea
- Shiny guinea pig, Cavia fulgida
- Santa Catarina's guinea pig, Cavia intermedia
- Greater guinea pig, Cavia magna
- Guinea pig, Cavia porcellus
- Yellow-toothed cavy, Galea flavidens
- Spix's yellow-toothed cavy, Galea spixii
- Acrobatic cavy, Kerodon acrobata
- Rock cavy, Kerodon rupestris
- Capybara, Hydrochoerus hydrochaeris LC

==== Dasyproctidae - agoutis and acouchis ====
- Azara's agouti, Dasyprocta azarae
- Black agouti, Dasyprocta fuliginosa
- Red-rumped agouti, Dasyprocta leporina
- Black-rumped agouti, Dasyprocta prymnolopha
- Central American agouti, Dasyprocta punctata
- Red acouchi, Myoprocta acouchy
- Green acouchi, Myoprocta pratti

==== Cuniculidae ====
- Lowland paca, Cuniculus paca

==== Ctenomyidae - tuco-tucos ====
- Brazilian tuco-tuco, Ctenomys brasiliensis
- Flamarion's tuco-tuco, Ctenomys flammarioni
- Tiny tuco-tuco, Ctenomys minutus
- Natterer's tuco-tuco, Ctenomys nattereri
- Rondon's tuco-tuco, Ctenomys rondoni
- Collared tuco-tuco, Ctenomys torquatus

==== Echimyidae - spiny rats and allies ====
- Painted tree-rat, Callistomys pictus
- Owl's spiny rat, Carterodon sulcidens
- Bishop's fossorial spiny rat, Clyomys bishopi
- Broad-headed spiny rat, Clyomys laticeps
- Bolivian bamboo rat, Dactylomys boliviensis
- Amazon bamboo rat, Dactylomys dactylinus
- White-faced spiny tree-rat, Echimys chrysurus
- Giant tree-rat, Toromys grandis
- Brandt's guiara, Euryzygomatomys guiara
- Fischer's guiara, Euryzygomatomys spinosus
- Yellow-crowned brush-tailed rat, Isothrix bistriata
- Rio Negro brush-tailed rat, Isothrix negrensis
- Plain brush-tailed rat, Isothrix pagurus
- Atlantic bamboo rat, Kannabateomys amblyonyx
- Tuft-tailed spiny tree-rat, Lonchothrix emiliae
- Long-tailed armored tree-rat, Makalata macrura
- Ferreira's spiny tree-rat, Mesomys hispidus
- Tufted-tailed spiny tree-rat, Mesomys occultus
- Pará spiny tree-rat, Mesomys stimulax
- Golden Atlantic tree-rat, Phyllomys blainvilii
- Orange-brown Atlantic tree-rat, Phyllomys brasiliensis
- Drab Atlantic tree-rat, Phyllomys dasythrix
- Kerr's Atlantic tree-rat, Phyllomys kerri
- Pallid Atlantic tree-rat, Phyllomys lamarum
- Lund's Atlantic tree-rat, Phyllomys lundi
- Mantiqueira Atlantic tree-rat, Phyllomys mantiqueirensis
- Long-furred Atlantic tree-rat, Phyllomys medius
- Black-spined Atlantic tree-rat, Phyllomys nigrispinus
- Rusty-sided Atlantic tree-rat, Phyllomys pattoni
- Giant Atlantic tree-rat, Phyllomys thomasi
- Short-furred Atlantic tree-rat, Phyllomys unicolor
- Napo spiny rat, Proechimys quadruplicatus
- Short-tailed spiny rat, Proechimys brevicauda
- Guyenne spiny rat, Proechimys guyannensis
- Cuvier's spiny rat, Proechimys cuvieri
- Stiff-spine spiny rat, Proechimys echinothrix
- Gardner's spiny rat, Proechimys gardneri
- Goeldi's spiny rat, Proechimys goeldii
- Guyanan spiny rat, Proechimys hoplomyoides
- Kulina spiny rat, Proechimys kulinae
- Long-tailed spiny rat, Proechimys longicaudatus
- Mouse-tailed Atlantic spiny rat, Proechimys myosuros
- Roberto's spiny rat, Proechimys roberti
- Patton's spiny rat, Proechimys pattoni
- Napo spiny rat, Proechimys quadruplicatus
- Simon's spiny rat, Proechimys simonsi
- Steere's spiny rat, Proechimys steerei
- Common punaré, Thrichomys apereoides
- White-spined Atlantic spiny rat, Trinomys albispinus
- Soft-spined Atlantic spiny rat, Trinomys dimidiatus
- Elias's Atlantic spiny rat, Trinomys eliasi
- Gracile Atlantic spiny rat, Trinomys gratiosus
- Ihering's Atlantic spiny rat, Trinomys iheringi
- Dark-caped Atlantic spiny rat, Trinomys mirapitanga
- Moojen's Atlantic spiny rat, Trinomys moojeni
- Spiked Atlantic spiny rat, Trinomys paratus
- Hairy Atlantic spiny rat, Trinomys setosus
- Yonenaga's Atlantic spiny rat, Trinomys yonenagae

=== Lagomorpha ===
==== Leporidae - rabbits and hares ====
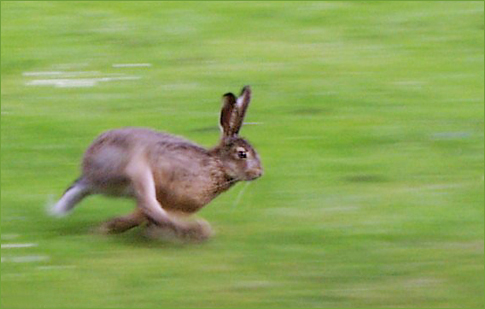
European hare

- Common tapetí, Sylvilagus brasiliensis EN
- Coastal tapetí, Sylvilagus tapetillus VU
- European hare, Lepus europaeus (introduced species) LC

== See also ==
- List of amphibians of Brazil
- List of birds of Brazil
- List of reptiles of Brazil
- List of mammal genera
- Lists of mammals by region
- Wildlife of Brazil
