= List of mammals of Paraguay =

This is a list of the mammal species recorded in Paraguay. There are 184 mammal species in Paraguay, of which two are endangered, seven are vulnerable, and twelve are near threatened.

The following tags are used to highlight each species' conservation status as assessed by the International Union for Conservation of Nature:

EX	Extinct	No reasonable doubt that the last individual has died.
EW	Extinct in the wild	Known only to survive in captivity or as a naturalized populations well outside its previous range.
CR	Critically endangered	The species is in imminent risk of extinction in the wild.
EN	Endangered	The species is facing an extremely high risk of extinction in the wild.
VU	Vulnerable	The species is facing a high risk of extinction in the wild.
NT	Near threatened	The species does not meet any of the criteria that would categorise it as risking extinction but it is likely to do so in the future.
LC	Least concern	There are no current identifiable risks to the species.
DD	Data deficient	There is inadequate information to make an assessment of the risks to this species.

Some species were assessed using an earlier set of criteria. Species assessed using this system have the following instead of near threatened and least concern categories:

LR/cd	Lower risk/conservation dependent	Species which were the focus of conservation programmes and may have moved into a higher risk category if that programme was discontinued.
LR/nt	Lower risk/near threatened	Species which are close to being classified as vulnerable but are not the subject of conservation programmes.
LR/lc	Lower risk/least concern	Species for which there are no identifiable risks.

== Subclass: Theria ==
=== Infraclass: Eutheria ===
==== Order: Cingulata (armadillos) ====
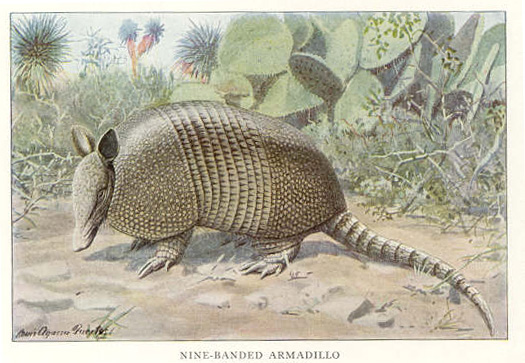
Nine-banded armadillo

The armadillos are small mammals with a bony armoured shell. They are native to the Americas. There are around 20 extant species.

- Family: Dasypodidae (armadillos)
  - Subfamily: Dasypodinae
    - Genus: Dasypus
      - Southern long-nosed armadillo, Dasypus hybridus NT
      - Nine-banded armadillo, Dasypus novemcinctus LC
      - Seven-banded armadillo, Dasypus septemcinctus LC
  - Subfamily: Euphractinae
    - Genus: Chaetophractus
      - Screaming hairy armadillo, Chaetophractus vellerosus LC
      - Big hairy armadillo, Chaetophractus villosus LC
    - Genus: Calyptophractus
      - Greater fairy armadillo, Calyptophractus retusus NT
    - Genus: Chlamyphorus
      - Greater fairy armadillo, Chlamyphorus retusus NT
    - Genus: Euphractus
      - Six-banded armadillo, Euphractus sexcinctus LC
  - Subfamily: Tolypeutinae
    - Genus: Cabassous
      - Chacoan naked-tailed armadillo, Cabassous chacoensis NT
      - Greater naked-tailed armadillo, Cabassous tatouay LC
    - Genus: Priodontes
      - Giant armadillo, Priodontes maximus VU
    - Genus: Tolypeutes
      - Southern three-banded armadillo, Tolypeutes matacus NT

==== Order: Pilosa (anteaters, sloths and tamanduas) ====
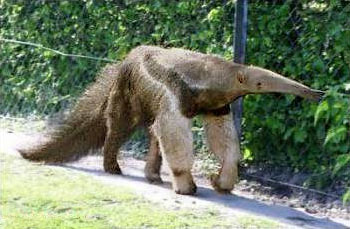
Giant anteater

The order Pilosa is extant only in the Americas and includes the anteaters, sloths, and tamanduas.

- Suborder: Folivora
  - Family: Bradypodidae (three-toed sloths)
    - Genus: Bradypus
      - Brown-throated three-toed sloth, B. variegatus LC
- Suborder: Vermilingua
  - Family: Myrmecophagidae (American anteaters)
    - Genus: Myrmecophaga
      - Giant anteater, M. tridactyla NT
    - Genus: Tamandua
      - Southern tamandua, T. tetradactyla LC

==== Order: Primates ====
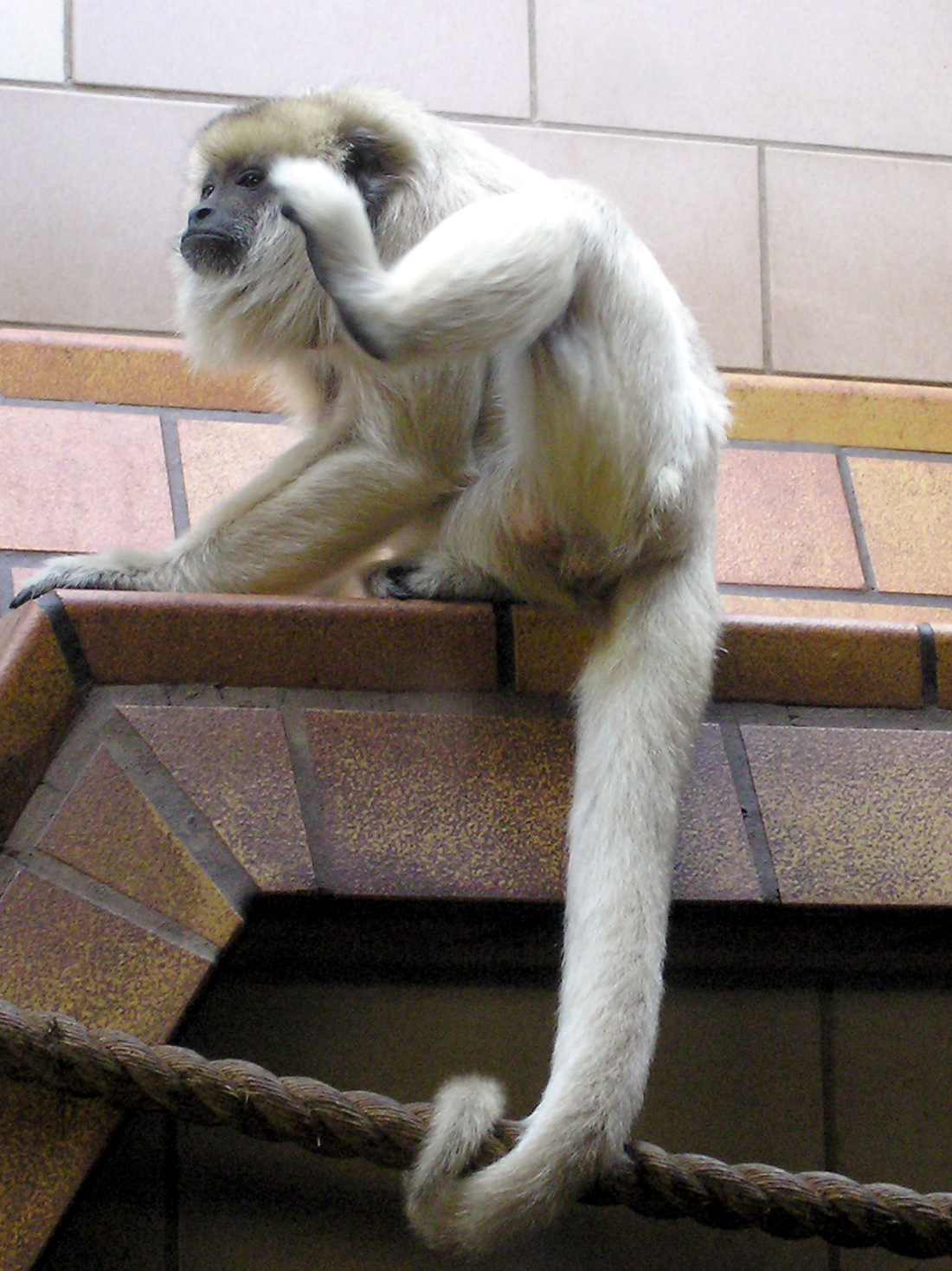
Black howler

The order Primates contains humans and their closest relatives: lemurs, lorisoids, monkeys, and apes.

- Suborder: Haplorhini
  - Infraorder: Simiiformes
    - Parvorder: Platyrrhini
        - Family: Aotidae
          - Genus: Aotus
            - Azara's night monkey, Aotus azarae LC
        - Family: Atelidae
          - Subfamily: Alouattinae
            - Genus: Alouatta
              - Black howler, Alouatta caraya LC
        - Family: Callithrichidae
          - Genus: Mico
            - Black-tailed marmoset, Mico melanurus LC
        - Family: Cebidae
          - Subfamily: Cebinae
            - Genus: Sapajus
              - Azaras's capuchin, Sapajus cay LC
        - Family: Pitheciidae
          - Subfamily: Callicebinae
            - Genus: Plecturocebus
              - White-coated titi, Plecturocebus pallescens LC

==== Order: Rodentia (rodents) ====
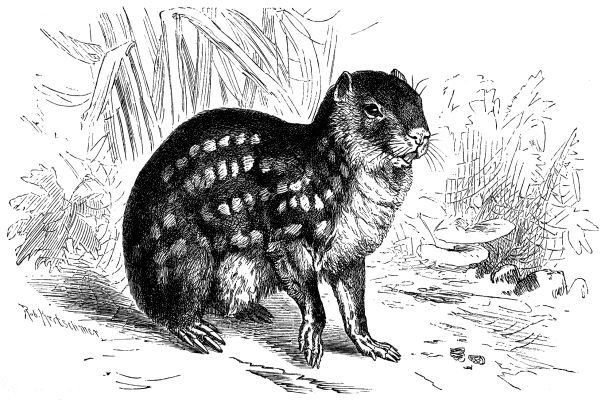
Lowland paca

Rodents make up the largest order of mammals, with over 40% of mammalian species. They have two incisors in the upper and lower jaw which grow continually and must be kept short by gnawing. Most rodents are small though the capybara can weigh up to 45 kg (99 lb).

- Suborder: Hystricognathi
    - Family: Erethizontidae (New World porcupines)
      - Subfamily: Erethizontinae
        - Genus: Coendou
          - Brazilian porcupine, Coendou prehensilis LR/lc
          - Paraguaian hairy dwarf porcupine, Coendou spinosus LR/lc
    - Family: Chinchillidae (viscachas and chinchillas)
      - Genus: Lagostomus
        - Plains viscacha, Lagostomus maximus LR/lc
    - Family: Caviidae (guinea pigs)
      - Subfamily: Caviinae
        - Genus: Cavia
          - Brazilian guinea pig, Cavia aperea LR/lc
      - Subfamily: Dolichotinae
        - Genus: Dolichotis
          - Chacoan mara, Dolichotis salinicola LR/nt
      - Subfamily: Hydrochoerinae (capybaras and rock cavies)
        - Genus: Hydrochoerus
          - Capybara, Hydrochoerus hydrochaeris LR/lc
    - Family: Dasyproctidae (agoutis and pacas)
      - Genus: Dasyprocta
        - Azara's agouti, Dasyprocta azarae VU
        - Central American agouti, Dasyprocta punctata LR/lc
    - Family: Cuniculidae
      - Genus: Cuniculus
        - Lowland paca, Cuniculus paca LC
    - Family: Ctenomyidae
      - Genus: Ctenomys
        - Bolivian tuco-tuco, Ctenomys boliviensis LR/lc
        - Conover's tuco-tuco, Ctenomys conoveri LR/lc
        - Chacoan tuco-tuco, Ctenomys dorsalis LR/lc
    - Family: Echimyidae
      - Subfamily: Dactylomyinae
        - Genus: Kannabateomys
          - Atlantic bamboo rat, Kannabateomys amblyonyx LR/lc
      - Subfamily: Eumysopinae
        - Genus: Euryzygomatomys
          - Fischer's guiara, Euryzygomatomys spinosus LR/lc
        - Genus: Proechimys
          - Long-tailed spiny rat, Proechimys longicaudatus LR/lc
        - Genus: Thrichomys
          - Punare, Thrichomys apereoides LR/lc
    - Family: Myocastoridae (coypus)
      - Genus: Myocastor
        - Coypu, Myocastor coypus LR/lc
- Suborder: Sciurognathi
    - Family: Sciuridae (squirrels)
      - Subfamily: Sciurinae
        - Tribe: Sciurini
          - Genus: Sciurus
            - Brazilian squirrel, Sciurus aestuans LR/lc
    - Family: Cricetidae
      - Subfamily: Sigmodontinae
        - Genus: Akodon
          - Azara's grass mouse, Akodon azarae LR/lc
          - Cursor grass mouse, Akodon cursor LR/lc
          - Blackish grass mouse, Akodon nigrita LR/lc
          - Chaco grass mouse, Akodon toba LR/lc
        - Genus: Andalgalomys
          - Pearson's chaco mouse, Andalgalomys pearsoni LR/lc
        - Genus: Bolomys
          - Hairy-tailed bolo mouse, Bolomys lasiurus LR/lc
        - Genus: Calomys
          - Crafty vesper mouse, Calomys callidus LR/lc
          - Large vesper mouse, Calomys callosus LR/lc
          - Small vesper mouse, Calomys laucha LR/lc
          - Drylands vesper mouse, Calomys musculinus LR/lc
        - Genus: Graomys
          - Gray leaf-eared mouse, Graomys griseoflavus LR/lc
        - Genus: Holochilus
          - Chaco marsh rat, Holochilus chacarius LR/lc
        - Genus: Oecomys
          - Mamore arboreal rice rat, Oecomys mamorae LR/lc
        - Genus: Oligoryzomys
          - Chacoan pygmy rice rat, Oligoryzomys chacoensis LR/lc
          - Small-eared pygmy rice rat, Oligoryzomys microtis LR/lc
          - Black-footed pygmy rice rat, Oligoryzomys nigripes LR/lc
        - Genus: Cerradomys
          - Terraced rice rat, Cerradomys subflavus LR/lc
        - Genus: Sooretamys
          - Paraguayan rice rat, Sooretamys angouya LR/lc
        - Genus: Hylaeamys
          - Azara's broad-headed rice rat, Hylaeamys megacephalus LR/lc
        - Genus: Euryoryzomys
          - Big-headed rice rat, Euryoryzomys russatus LR/lc
          - Elegant rice rat, Euryoryzomys nitidus LR/lc
        - Genus: Oxymycterus
          - Spy hocicudo, Oxymycterus delator LR/lc
        - Genus: Pseudoryzomys
          - Brazilian false rice rat, Pseudoryzomys simplex LR/lc
        - Genus: Scapteromys
          - Waterhouse's swamp rat, Scapteromys tumidus LR/lc

==== Order: Lagomorpha (lagomorphs) ====
The lagomorphs comprise two families, Leporidae (hares and rabbits), and Ochotonidae (pikas). Though they can resemble rodents, and were classified as a superfamily in that order until the early 20th century, they have since been considered a separate order. They differ from rodents in a number of physical characteristics, such as having four incisors in the upper jaw rather than two.

- Family: Leporidae (rabbits, hares)
  - Genus: Sylvilagus
    - Common tapetí, Sylvilagus brasiliensis EN

==== Order: Chiroptera (bats) ====
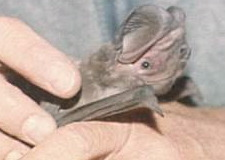
Western mastiff bat

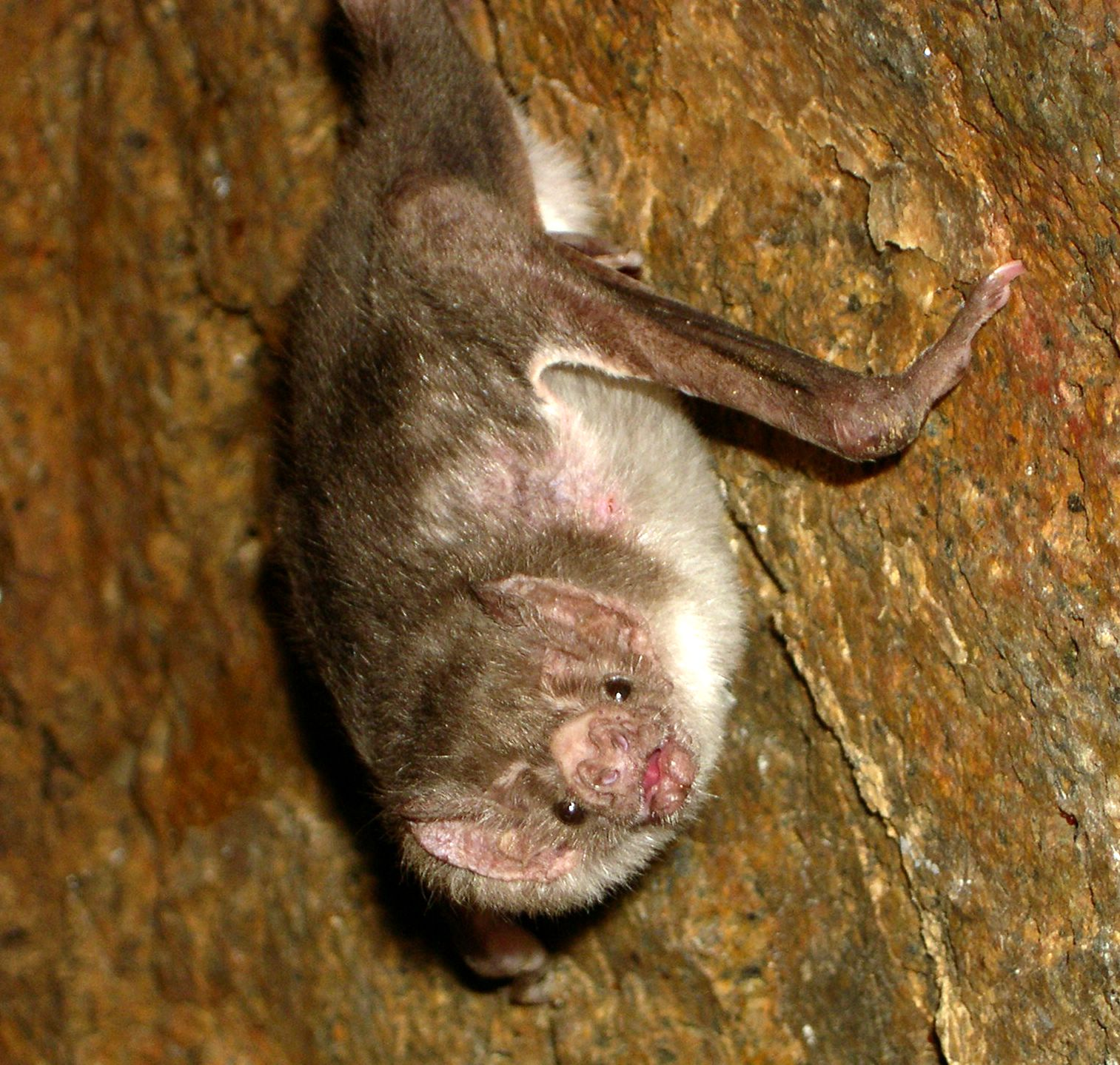
Common vampire bat

The bats' most distinguishing feature is that their forelimbs are developed as wings, making them the only mammals capable of flight. Bat species account for about 20% of all mammals.

  - Family: Noctilionidae
    - Genus: Noctilio
      - Lesser bulldog bat, Noctilio albiventris LR/lc
      - Greater bulldog bat, Noctilio leporinus LR/lc
  - Family: Vespertilionidae
    - Subfamily: Myotinae
      - Genus: Myotis
        - Silver-tipped myotis, Myotis albescens LR/lc
        - Black myotis, Myotis nigricans LR/lc
        - Riparian myotis, Myotis riparius LR/lc
        - Red myotis, Myotis ruber VU
        - Velvety myotis, Myotis simus LR/lc
    - Subfamily: Vespertilioninae
      - Genus: Eptesicus
        - Brazilian brown bat, Eptesicus brasiliensis LR/lc
        - Diminutive serotine, Eptesicus diminutus LR/lc
        - Argentine brown bat, Eptesicus furinalis LR/lc
        - Big brown bat, Eptesicus fuscus LR/lc
      - Genus: Histiotus
        - Tropical big-eared brown bat, Histiotus velatus LR/lc
      - Genus: Lasiurus
        - Desert red bat, Lasiurus blossevillii LR/lc
        - Hoary bat, Lasiurus cinereus LR/lc
        - Southern yellow bat, Lasiurus ega LR/lc
  - Family: Molossidae
    - Genus: Cynomops
      - Cinnamon dog-faced bat, Cynomops abrasus LR/nt
      - Southern dog-faced bat, Cynomops planirostris LR/lc
    - Genus: Eumops
      - Dwarf bonneted bat, Eumops bonariensis LR/lc
      - Big bonneted bat, Eumops dabbenei LR/lc
      - Wagner's bonneted bat, Eumops glaucinus LR/lc
      - Western mastiff bat, Eumops perotis LR/lc
    - Genus: Molossops
      - Dwarf dog-faced bat, Molossops temminckii LR/lc
    - Genus: Molossus
      - Black mastiff bat, Molossus ater LR/lc
      - Velvety free-tailed bat, Molossus molossus LR/lc
    - Genus: Nyctinomops
      - Peale's free-tailed bat, Nyctinomops aurispinosus LR/lc
      - Broad-eared bat, Nyctinomops laticaudatus LR/lc
      - Big free-tailed bat, Nyctinomops macrotis LR/lc
    - Genus: Promops
      - Big crested mastiff bat, Promops centralis LR/lc
      - Brown mastiff bat, Promops nasutus LR/lc
    - Genus: Tadarida
      - Mexican free-tailed bat, Tadarida brasiliensis LR/nt
  - Family: Emballonuridae
    - Genus: Peropteryx
      - Lesser doglike bat, Peropteryx macrotis LR/lc
  - Family: Phyllostomidae
    - Subfamily: Phyllostominae
      - Genus: Chrotopterus
        - Big-eared woolly bat, Chrotopterus auritus LR/lc
      - Genus: Lophostoma
        - White-throated round-eared bat, Lophostoma silvicolum LR/lc
      - Genus: Macrophyllum
        - Long-legged bat, Macrophyllum macrophyllum LR/lc
      - Genus: Micronycteris
        - Little big-eared bat, Micronycteris megalotis LR/lc
      - Genus: Phyllostomus
        - Pale spear-nosed bat, Phyllostomus discolor LR/lc
        - Greater spear-nosed bat, Phyllostomus hastatus LR/lc
      - Genus: Tonatia
        - Greater round-eared bat, Tonatia bidens LR/lc
    - Subfamily: Glossophaginae
      - Genus: Glossophaga
        - Pallas's long-tongued bat, Glossophaga soricina LR/lc
    - Subfamily: Carolliinae
      - Genus: Carollia
        - Seba's short-tailed bat, Carollia perspicillata LR/lc
    - Subfamily: Stenodermatinae
      - Genus: Artibeus
        - Fringed fruit-eating bat, Artibeus fimbriatus LR/nt
        - Jamaican fruit bat, Artibeus jamaicensis LR/lc
        - Great fruit-eating bat, Artibeus lituratus LR/lc
        - Flat-faced fruit-eating bat, Artibeus planirostris LR/lc
      - Genus: Pygoderma
        - Ipanema bat, Pygoderma bilabiatum LR/nt
      - Genus: Sturnira
        - Little yellow-shouldered bat, Sturnira lilium LR/lc
      - Genus: Vampyressa
        - Southern little yellow-eared bat, Vampyressa pusilla LR/lc
      - Genus: Platyrrhinus
        - White-lined broad-nosed bat, Platyrrhinus lineatus LR/lc
    - Subfamily: Desmodontinae
      - Genus: Desmodus
        - Common vampire bat, Desmodus rotundus LR/lc

==== Order: Carnivora (carnivorans) ====
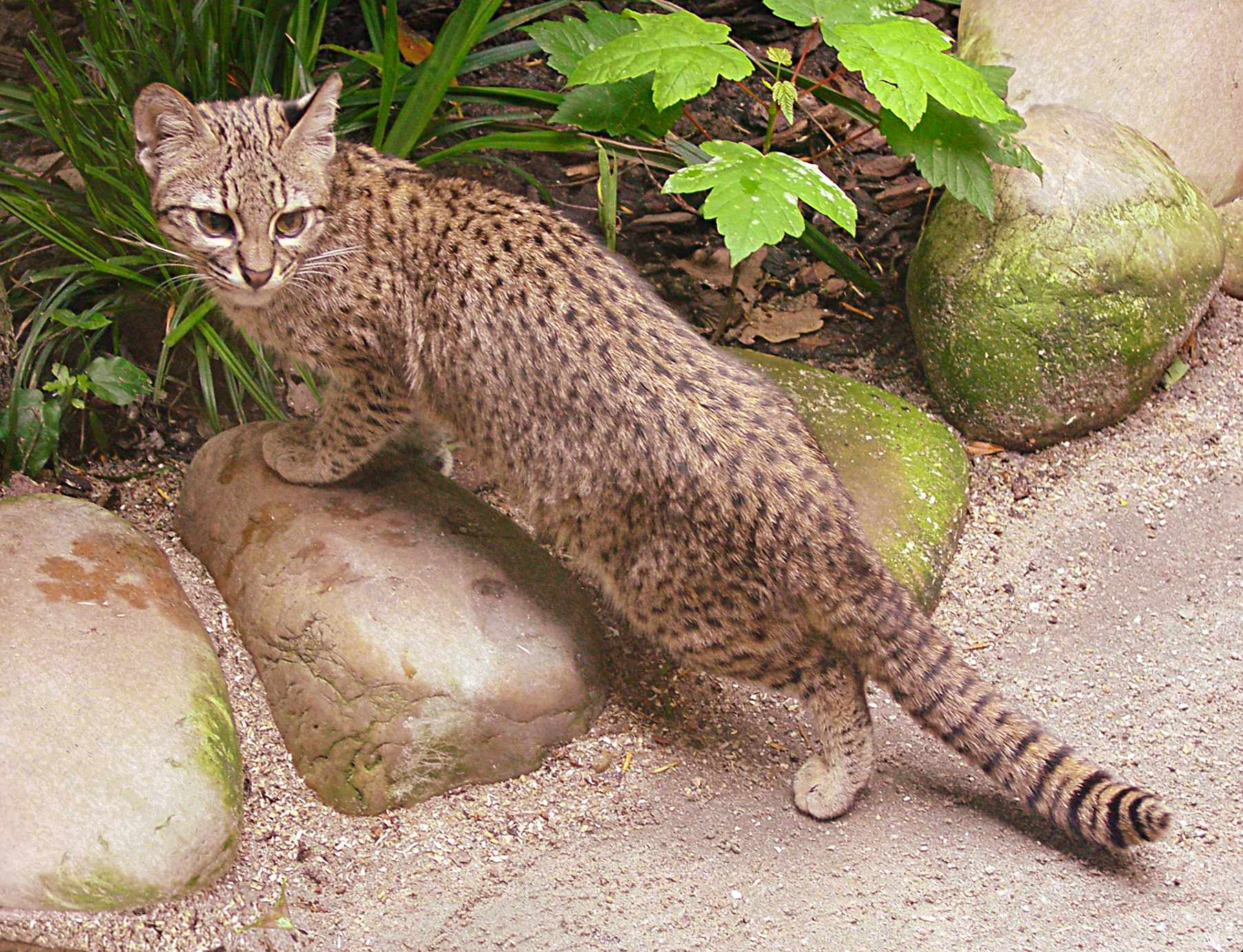
Geoffroy's cat

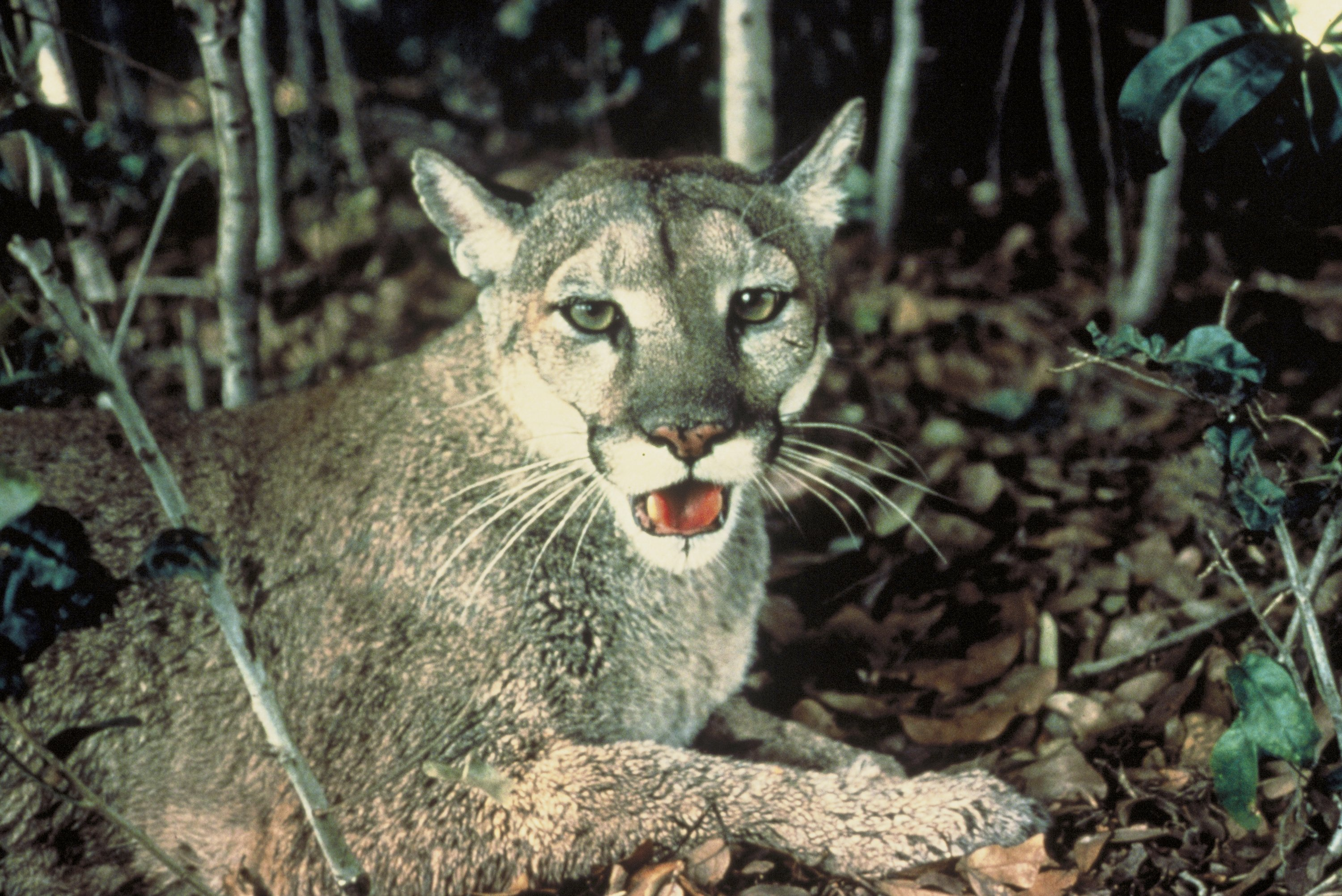
Cougar

There are over 260 species of carnivorans, the majority of which feed primarily on meat. They have a characteristic skull shape and dentition.

- Suborder: Feliformia
  - Family: Felidae (cats)
    - Subfamily: Felinae
      - Genus: Leopardus
        - Pampas cat L. colocola NT
        - Geoffroy's cat L. geoffroyi LC
        - Ocelot L. pardalis LC
        - Oncilla L. tigrinus VU
        - Margay L. wiedii NT
      - Genus: Herpailurus
        - Jaguarundi, H. yagouaroundi LC
      - Genus: Puma
        - Cougar, P. concolor LC
      - Subfamily: Pantherinae
        - Genus: Panthera
          - Jaguar, P. onca NT
- Suborder: Caniformia
  - Family: Canidae (dogs, foxes)
    - Genus: Dusicyon
      - Dusicyon avus EX
    - Genus: Lycalopex
      - Pampas fox, Lycalopex gymnocercus LC
    - Genus: Cerdocyon
      - Crab-eating fox, Cerdocyon thous LC
    - Genus: Speothos
      - Bush dog, Speothos venaticus VU
    - Genus: Chrysocyon
      - Maned wolf, Chrysocyon brachyurus NT
  - Family: Procyonidae (raccoons)
    - Genus: Procyon
      - Crab-eating raccoon, Procyon cancrivorus
    - Genus: Nasua
      - South American coati, Nasua nasua
  - Family: Mustelidae (mustelids)
    - Genus: Galictis
      - Lesser grison, Galictis cuja
    - Genus: Lontra
      - Neotropical river otter, Lontra longicaudis DD
    - Genus: Pteronura
      - Giant otter, Pteronura brasiliensis EN
  - Family: Mephitidae
    - Genus: Conepatus
      - Humboldt's hog-nosed skunk, Conepatus humboldtii

==== Order: Perissodactyla (odd-toed ungulates) ====
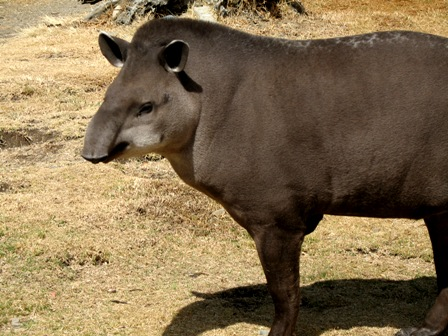
Brazilian tapir

The odd-toed ungulates are browsing and grazing mammals. They are usually large to very large, and have relatively simple stomachs and a large middle toe.

  - Family: Tapiridae (tapirs)
    - Genus: Tapirus
      - Brazilian tapir, Tapirus terrestris VU

==== Order: Artiodactyla (even-toed ungulates) ====
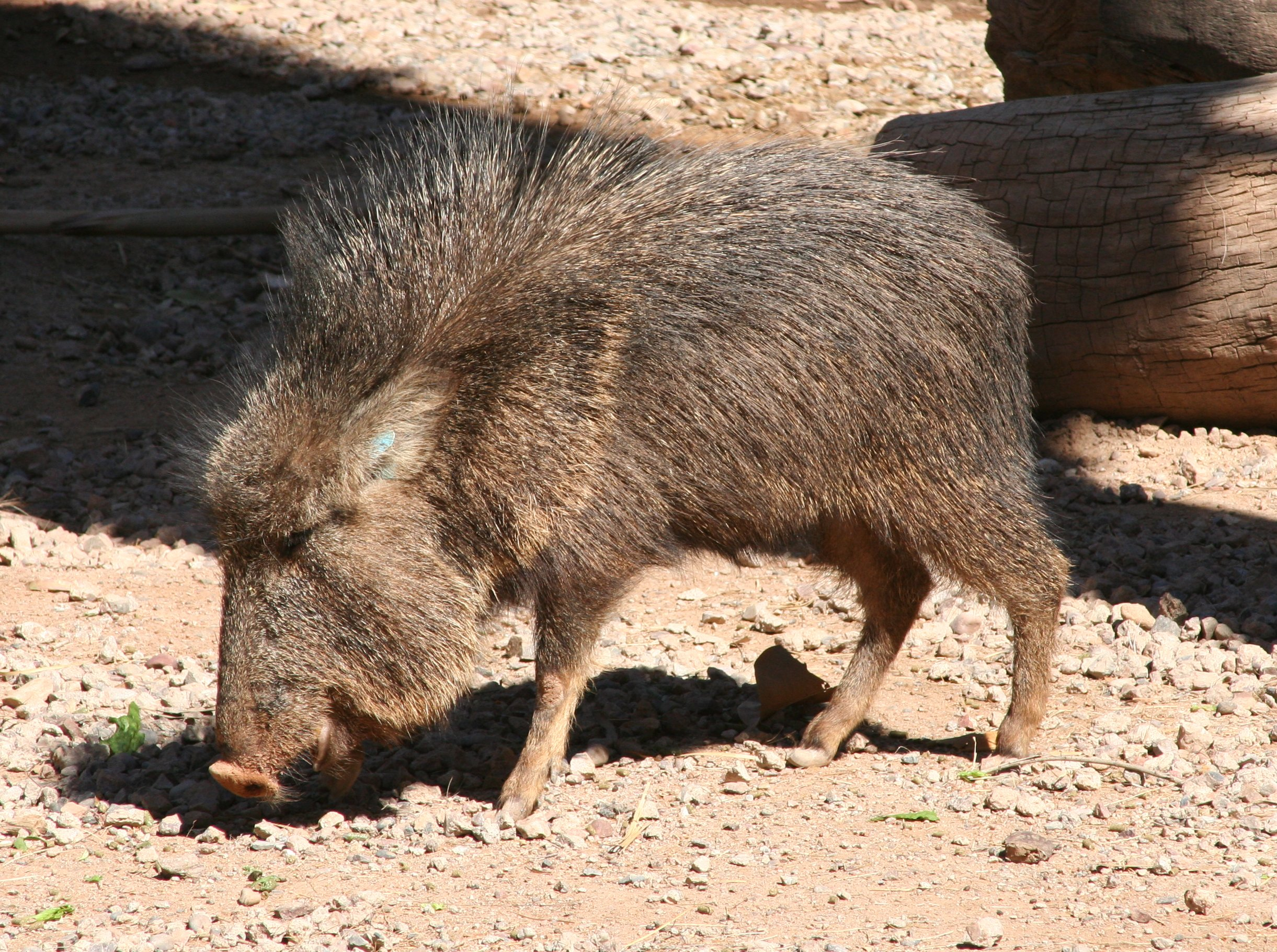
Chacoan peccary

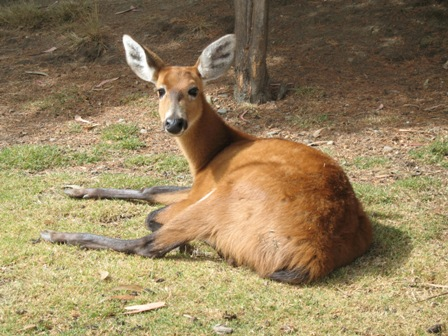
Marsh deer

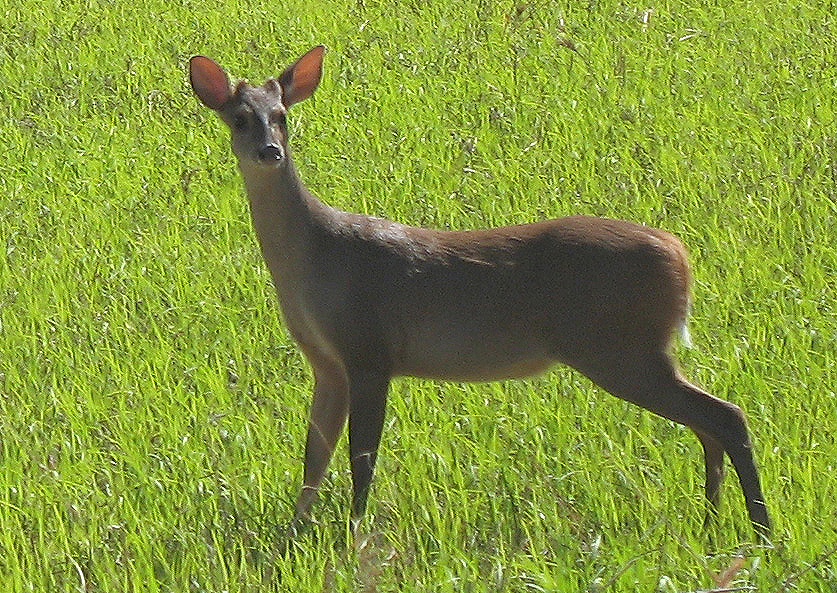
Red brocket

The even-toed ungulates are ungulates whose weight is borne about equally by the third and fourth toes, rather than mostly or entirely by the third as in perissodactyls. There are about 220 artiodactyl species, including many that are of great economic importance to humans.

  - Family: Tayassuidae (peccaries)
    - Genus: Catagonus
      - Chacoan peccary, Catagonus wagneri EN
    - Genus: Dicotyles
      - Collared peccary, Dicotyles tajacu LC
    - Genus: Tayassu
      - White-lipped peccary, Tayassu pecari NT
  - Family: Camelidae (camels, llamas)
    - Genus: Lama
      - Guanaco, Lama guanicoe LR/lc
  - Family: Cervidae (deer)
    - Subfamily: Capreolinae
      - Genus: Blastocerus
        - Marsh deer, Blastocerus dichotomus VU
      - Genus: Mazama
        - Red brocket, Mazama americana DD
        - Pygmy brocket, Mazama nana DD
      - Genus: Ozotoceros
        - Pampas deer, Ozotoceros bezoarticus NT

=== Infraclass: Metatheria ===
==== Order: Didelphimorphia (common opossums) ====
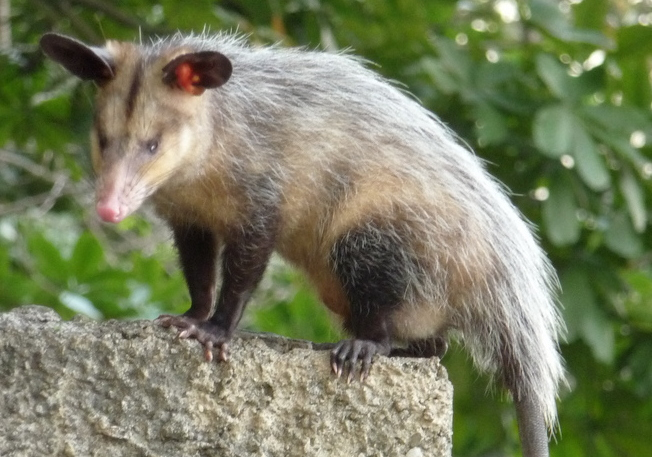
Common opossum

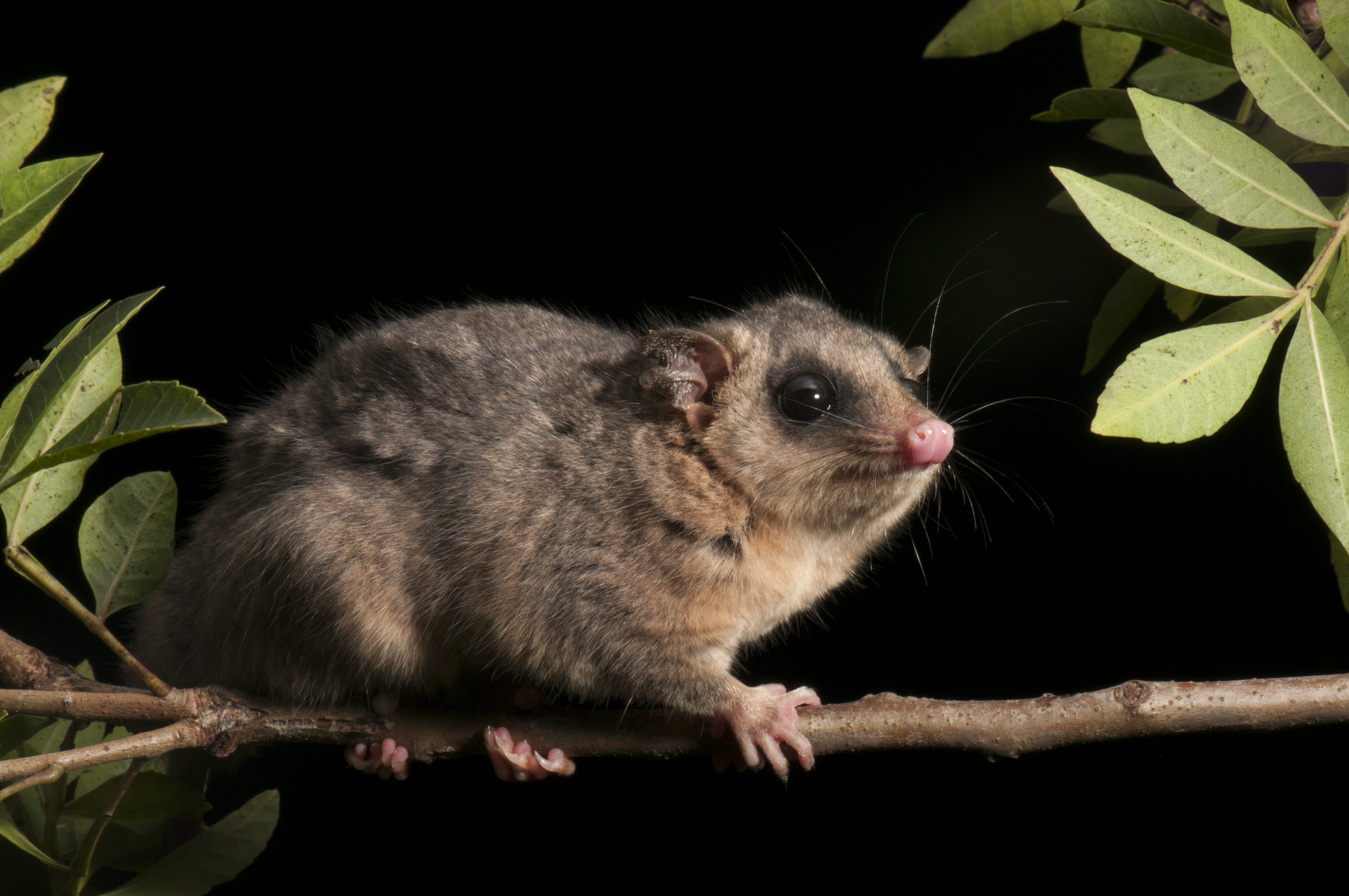
Tate's woolly mouse opossum

Didelphimorphia is the order of common opossums of the Western Hemisphere. Opossums probably diverged from the basic South American marsupials in the late Cretaceous or early Paleocene. They are small to medium-sized marsupials, about the size of a large house cat, with a long snout and prehensile tail.

  - Family: Didelphidae (American opossums)
    - Subfamily: Caluromyinae
      - Genus: Caluromys
        - Brown-eared woolly opossum, Caluromys lanatus LR/nt
    - Subfamily: Didelphinae
      - Genus: Chironectes
        - Water opossum, Chironectes minimus LR/nt
      - Genus: Didelphis
        - White-eared opossum, Didelphis albiventris LR/lc
        - Big-eared opossum, Didelphis aurita LR/lc
        - Common opossum, Didelphis marsupialis LR/lc
      - Genus: Gracilinanus
        - Agile gracile opossum, Gracilinanus agilis LR/nt
      - Genus: Lutreolina
        - Big lutrine opossum, Lutreolina crassicaudata LR/lc
      - Genus: Marmosa
        - Woolly mouse opossum, Marmosa demerarae LR/lc
        - Tate's woolly mouse opossum, Marmosa paraguayana LC
      - Genus: Metachirus
        - Brown four-eyed opossum, Metachirus nudicaudatus LR/lc
      - Genus: Monodelphis
        - Gray short-tailed opossum, Monodelphis domestica LR/lc
        - Southern red-sided opossum, Monodelphis sorex VU
      - Genus: Philander
        - Gray four-eyed opossum, Philander opossum LR/lc
      - Genus: Thylamys
        - Paraguayan fat-tailed mouse opossum, Thylamys macrurus LR/nt
        - Common fat-tailed mouse opossum, Thylamys pusillus LR/lc

== See also ==
- List of chordate orders
- Lists of mammals by region
- List of prehistoric mammals
- Mammal classification
- List of mammals described in the 2000s
