= Thrichomys laurentius =

Conservation status
- Data Deficient (IUCN 3.1)

Scientific classification
- Kingdom: Animalia
- Phylum: Chordata
- Class: Mammalia
- Infraclass: Placentalia
- Order: Rodentia
- Family: Echimyidae
- Tribe: Myocastorini
- Genus: Thrichomys
- Species: T. laurentius

Binomial name
- Thrichomys laurentius Thomas, 1904
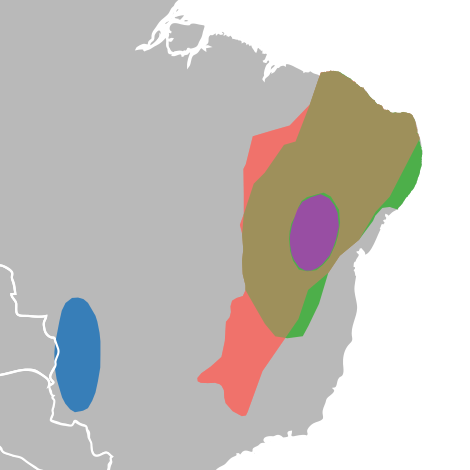
- Thrichomys distribution T. laurentius in green (yellow where overlapping T. apereoides, entirely overlaps T. laurentius)

Species of mammals in the spiny rat family of rodents

Thrichomys laurentius, the Sao Lourenço punaré, is a South American caviomorph rodent of the spiny rat family. It was formerly considered a subspecies of T apereoides. It is endemic to the northern Caatinga ecoregion of northeastern Brazil, a region of dry tropical forest and scrub, at elevations from 15 to 800 m. Little is known about its population trends and threats.
