= Cerradomys vivoi =

Scientific classification
- Kingdom: Animalia
- Phylum: Chordata
- Class: Mammalia
- Order: Rodentia
- Family: Cricetidae
- Subfamily: Sigmodontinae
- Genus: Cerradomys
- Species: C. vivoi

Binomial name
- Cerradomys vivoi Percequillo, Hingst-Zaher, & Bonvicino, 2008

Species of rodent

Cerradomys vivoi is a species of rodent from South America in the genus Cerradomys. It occurs only in eastern Brazil, in the states of Bahia, Goiás, and Sergipe, and was formerly included in C. subflavus.
