= Cerradomys langguthi =

Scientific classification
- Domain: Eukaryota
- Kingdom: Animalia
- Phylum: Chordata
- Class: Mammalia
- Order: Rodentia
- Family: Cricetidae
- Subfamily: Sigmodontinae
- Genus: Cerradomys
- Species: C. langguthi

Binomial name
- Cerradomys langguthi Percequillo et al., 2008

Species of rodent

Cerradomys langguthi is a species of rodent from South America in the genus Cerradomys. It occurs only in northeastern Brazil and was formerly included in C. subflavus.
