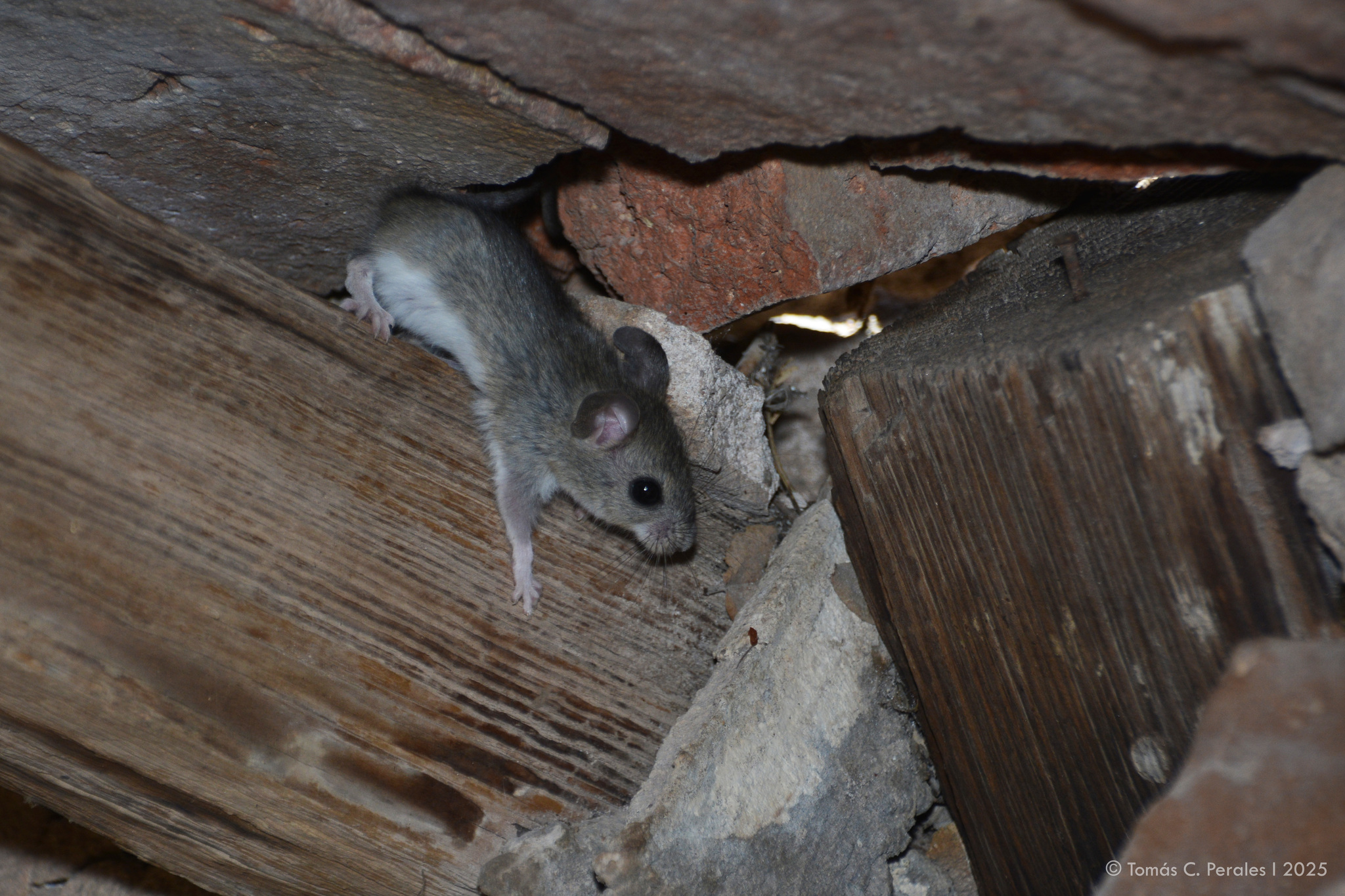

Conservation status
- Data Deficient (IUCN 3.1)

Scientific classification
- Kingdom: Animalia
- Phylum: Chordata
- Class: Mammalia
- Order: Rodentia
- Family: Cricetidae
- Subfamily: Sigmodontinae
- Genus: Graomys
- Species: G. chacoensis

Binomial name
- Graomys chacoensis Allen, 1901

Synonyms
- Graomys centralis

= Central leaf-eared mouse =

Species of rodent

The central leaf-eared mouse (Graomys chacoensis) is a species of rodent in the family Cricetidae. It is known only from central Argentina. Prior to 1994, it was considered a subspecies of G. griseoflavus. Then referred to as G. centralis, as of 2019 it was referred to as G. chacoensis by the IUCN.
