= Cerradomys scotti =

Conservation status
- Least Concern (IUCN 3.1)

Scientific classification
- Kingdom: Animalia
- Phylum: Chordata
- Class: Mammalia
- Order: Rodentia
- Family: Cricetidae
- Subfamily: Sigmodontinae
- Genus: Cerradomys
- Species: C. scotti

Binomial name
- Cerradomys scotti (Langguth and Bonvicino, 2002)

Synonyms
- Oryzomys scotti Langguth and Bonvicino, 2002; Oryzomys andersoni Brooks and Baker, 2004 [Cerradomys] scotti Weksler, Percequillo, and Voss, 2006; Cerradomys andersoni Dunnum and Vargas, 2008

Species of rodent

Cerradomys scotti, also known as Lindbergh's oryzomys, is a rodent species from South America in the genus Cerradomys. It is terrestrial and is found in the cerrado (savanna) ecozone of south central Brazil, Bolivia and Paraguay. The species is common and appears to tolerate a degree of agricultural habitat modification.

It was first described in 2002 as Oryzomys scotti, after zoologist Scott Lindbergh. In 2004, another new species, Oryzomys andersoni, was described by a team from Texas Tech University on the basis of a specimen taken at Pozo Mario, Santa Cruz Department, southeastern Bolivia. It was named after eminent mammalogist Sydney Anderson in honor of his contributions to the study of Bolivian mammals. It was subsequently recognized as belonging to the same species as Oryzomys scotti on the basis of morphological and molecular evidence. In 2006, the species was transferred to the new genus Cerradomys, so that it became known as Cerradomys scotti, with Oryzomys andersoni as a junior synonym.

The holotype of Oryzomys andersoni has a white belly and a grey–brown back with a black dorsal stripe. It has head-body length 111 mm (4.4 in), tail length 122 mm (4.8 in), hindfoot length 30 mm (1.2 in), ear length 17 mm (0.67 in) and weight 37 g (1.3 oz). It was collected in cerrado habitat. Other mammals found in the same area include Monodelphis domestica, Proechimys longicaudatus, Sciurus spadiceus, Galea spixii, Dasyprocta punctata, the nine-banded armadillo (Dasypus novemcinctus), the crab-eating fox (Cerdocyon thous), the red brocket (Mazama americana), and the brown brocket (Mazama gouazoupira).
