= Cerradomys maracajuensis =

Conservation status
- Least Concern (IUCN 3.1)

Scientific classification
- Kingdom: Animalia
- Phylum: Chordata
- Class: Mammalia
- Order: Rodentia
- Family: Cricetidae
- Subfamily: Sigmodontinae
- Genus: Cerradomys
- Species: C. maracajuensis

Binomial name
- Cerradomys maracajuensis (Langguth and Bonvicino, 2002)

Synonyms
- Oryzomys maracajuensis Langguth and Bonvicino, 2002; [Cerradomys] maracajuensis Weksler, Percequillo, and Voss, 2006

Species of rodent

Cerradomys maracajuensis, also known as the Maracaju oryzomys, is a rodent species from South America. It is terrestrial and is found in gallery forests in Bolivia, Paraguay and nearby Brazil and Peru. It was first discovered near the Brazilian city of Maracaju.
