= Oligoryzomys chacoensis =

Conservation status
- Least Concern (IUCN 3.1)

Scientific classification
- Kingdom: Animalia
- Phylum: Chordata
- Class: Mammalia
- Order: Rodentia
- Family: Cricetidae
- Subfamily: Sigmodontinae
- Genus: Oligoryzomys
- Species: O. chacoensis

Binomial name
- Oligoryzomys chacoensis (Myers & Carleton, 1981)

Species of rodent

Oligoryzomys chacoensis, also known as the Chacoan colilargo or Chacoan pygmy rice rat, is a rodent species from South America. It is found in the Gran Chaco region of southeastern Bolivia, southwestern Brazil, Paraguay, and northeastern Argentina. Its karyotype has 2n = 58 and FNa = 74.

It is one of the hosts of the hantavirus serotype Bermejo.

== Literature cited ==
- Musser, G. G.; Carleton, M. D. (2005). "Superfamily Muroidea". In Wilson, D. E.; Reeder, D. M. (eds.). Mammal Species of the World: A Taxonomic and Geographic Reference (3rd ed.). Johns Hopkins University Press. p. 1140. ISBN 978-0-8018-8221-0. OCLC 62265494.
