= Pale leaf-eared mouse =

Conservation status
- Least Concern (IUCN 3.1)

Scientific classification
- Kingdom: Animalia
- Phylum: Chordata
- Class: Mammalia
- Order: Rodentia
- Family: Cricetidae
- Subfamily: Sigmodontinae
- Genus: Graomys
- Species: G. domorum

Binomial name
- Graomys domorum (Thomas, 1902)

Species of rodent

The pale leaf-eared mouse (Graomys domorum) is a species of rodent in the family Cricetidae. It is found in Argentina and Bolivia.
