= Paraguayan punaré =

Conservation status
- Least Concern (IUCN 3.1)

Scientific classification
- Kingdom: Animalia
- Phylum: Chordata
- Class: Mammalia
- Order: Rodentia
- Family: Echimyidae
- Subfamily: Echimyinae
- Tribe: Myocastorini
- Genus: Thrichomys
- Species: T. pachyurus

Binomial name
- Thrichomys pachyurus (Wagner, 1845)
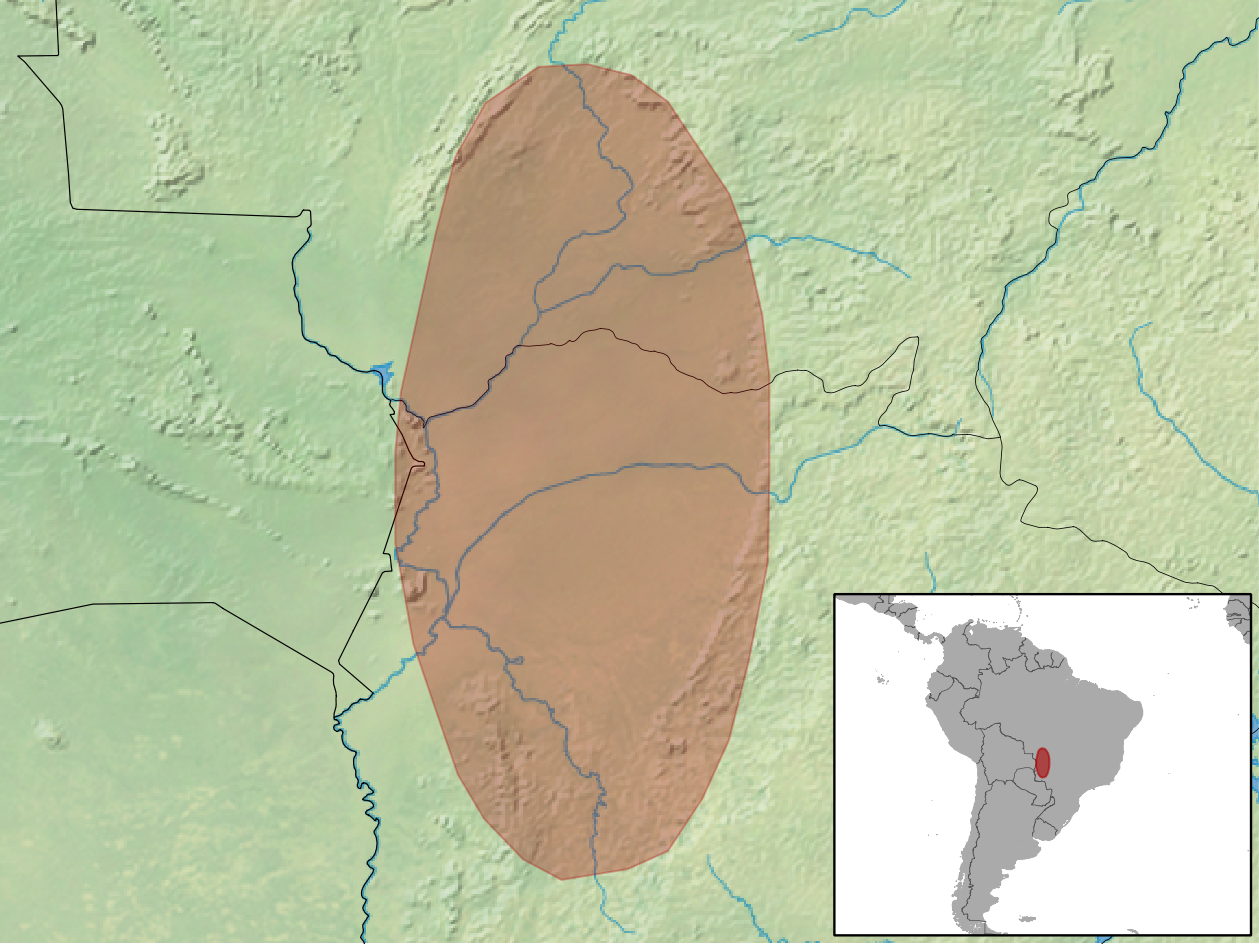

Species of mammals in the spiny rat family of rodents

The Paraguayan punaré (Thrichomys pachyurus) is a caviomorph rodent of South America from the spiny rat family. With its skull averaging 55 mm long, it is the largest species in the genus Thrichomys. It is found in savannas and forest edges in southwestern Brazil and northern Paraguay within the cerrado ecoregion. The species tolerates a degree of habitat disturbance, and is considered abundant throughout its range.

Its karyotype has 2n = 34 and FN (fundamental number) = 64.
