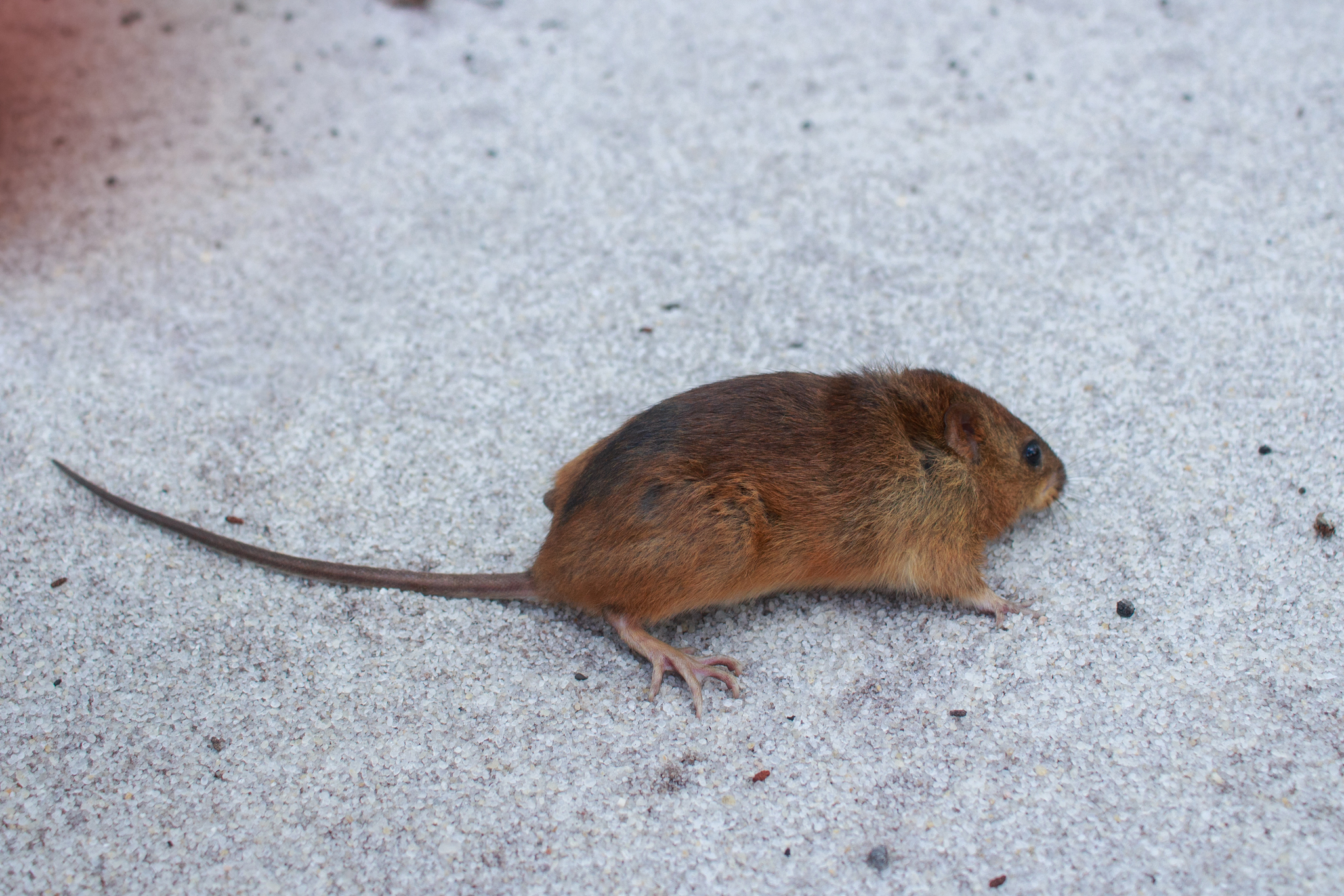
- Cerradomys goytaca

Scientific classification
- Kingdom: Animalia
- Phylum: Chordata
- Class: Mammalia
- Order: Rodentia
- Family: Cricetidae
- Subfamily: Sigmodontinae
- Genus: Cerradomys
- Species: C. goytaca

Binomial name
- Cerradomys goytaca Tavares, Pessôa and Gonçalves, 2011

= Cerradomys goytaca =

Species of rodent

Cerradomys goytaca is a species of rodent from South America in the genus Cerradomys. It occurs only in sandy plains in southeastern Brazil.
