= Highlands punaré =

Conservation status
- Least Concern (IUCN 3.1)

Scientific classification
- Kingdom: Animalia
- Phylum: Chordata
- Class: Mammalia
- Order: Rodentia
- Family: Echimyidae
- Subfamily: Echimyinae
- Tribe: Myocastorini
- Genus: Thrichomys
- Species: T. inermis

Binomial name
- Thrichomys inermis Pictet, 1841
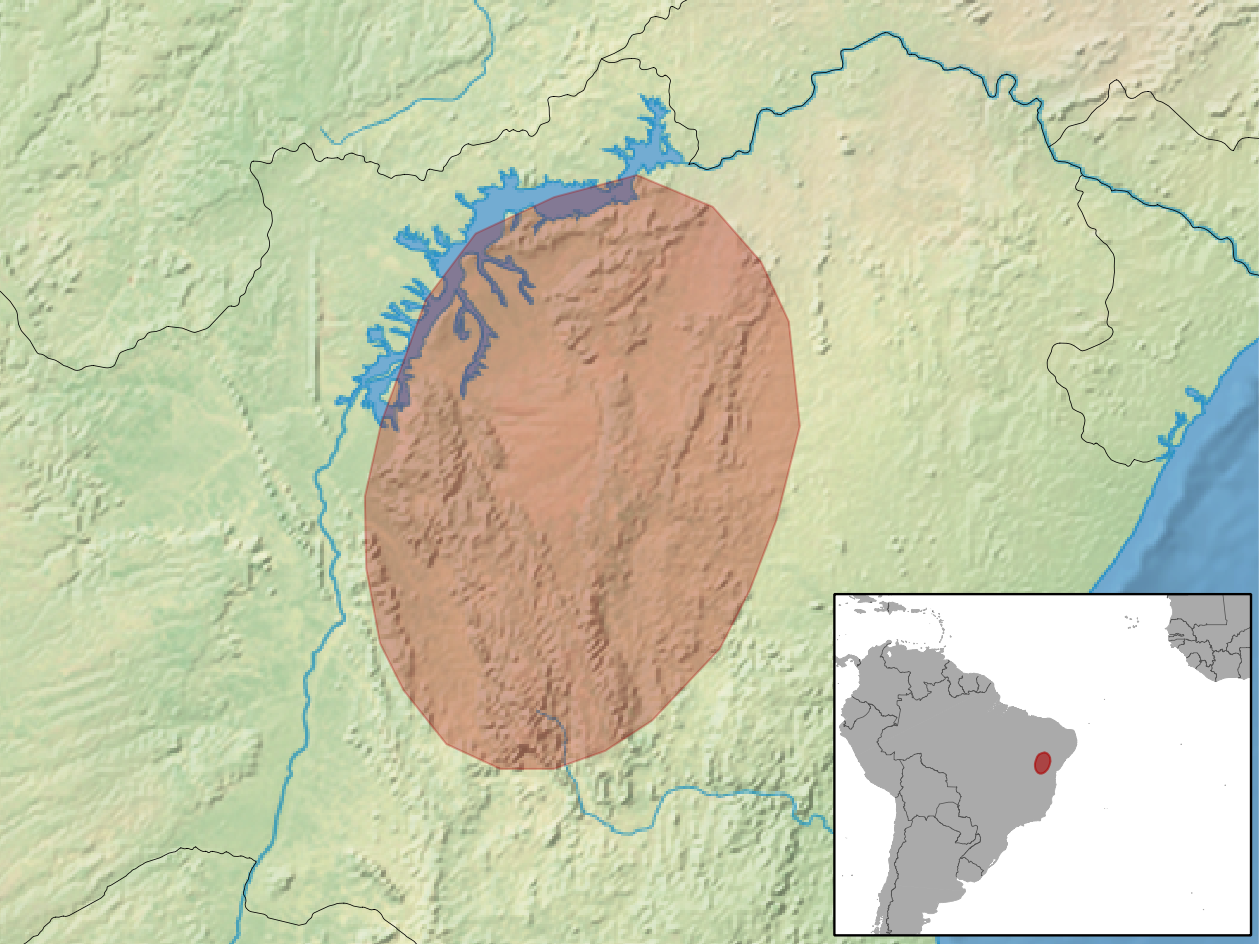

Species of mammals in the spiny rat family of rodents

The highlands punaré (Thrichomys inermis) is a caviomorph rodent of South America from the spiny rat family. It is endemic to gallery forest, savanna and rocky outcrop habitats in Bahia State within the Caatinga ecoregion of eastern Brazil at elevations from 260 m to 1030 m. It sometimes nests and often takes refuge in crevices in rock formations, as means of both predator avoidance and moderating temperature extremes. The species tolerates a degree of habitat disturbance. Although hunted, it is considered common throughout its range. Its karyotype has 2n = 26 and FN = 48.

The etymology of the species name corresponds to the Latin word inermis meaning unarmed, defenceless — itself constructed from the prefix in- meaning without and the stem arma meaning defensive arms, armor —, and refers to the soft fur of Thrichomys members replacing the spiny hair of the other genera of Echimyidae.
