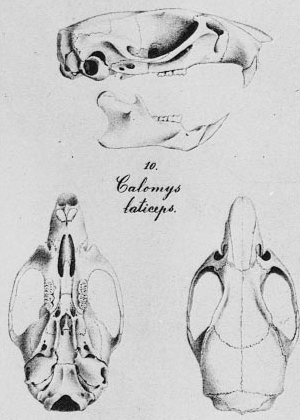
- Cerradomys sp.

Scientific classification
- Domain: Eukaryota
- Kingdom: Animalia
- Phylum: Chordata
- Class: Mammalia
- Order: Rodentia
- Family: Cricetidae
- Subfamily: Sigmodontinae
- Tribe: Oryzomyini
- Genus: Cerradomys; Weksler et al., 2006

Type species
- Hesperomys subflavus Wagner, 1842

Species
- See text

= Cerradomys =

Genus of rodents

Cerradomys is a genus of oryzomyine rodents from eastern Bolivia, Paraguay, and central Brazil found in cerrado, Caatinga and Gran Chaco habitats.

The species in this genus have historically been placed in Oryzomys, but according to cladistic research, they are not more closely related to the type species of Oryzomys than species in some other genera are. Its sister group may be a clade of oryzomyines living in open or aquatic habitats, comprising, among others, Aegialomys, Nectomys and Sigmodontomys. Sooretamys angouya, also formerly in Oryzomys, is another relative; it has been placed in the same group as the species of Cerradomys in the past. The generic name Cerradomys is a compound of the word "Cerrado" and the Ancient Greek μῦς mys "mouse" and therefore means "Cerrado mouse".

The dorsal pelage is brownish, the ventral pelage, greyish. It has small ears and a relatively long tail. There are crowns of hair on the hindfeet at the bases of the claws.

In addition to its external classification, the internal classification of the group is also subject to change. Until 2002, all members of the group were placed in a single species, then called Oryzomys subflavus, but since then, eight new species have been described, often on the basis of karyotypic differences, but two of these later turned out to represent the same species.

The genus currently contains the following species:

- Cerradomys akroai
- Cerradomys goytaca
- Cerradomys langguthi
- Cerradomys maracajuensis
- Cerradomys marinhus
- Cerradomys scotti (including Oryzomys andersoni)
- Cerradomys subflavus
- Cerradomys vivoi
