= Cerradomys marinhus =

Conservation status
- Least Concern (IUCN 3.1)

Scientific classification
- Kingdom: Animalia
- Phylum: Chordata
- Class: Mammalia
- Order: Rodentia
- Family: Cricetidae
- Subfamily: Sigmodontinae
- Genus: Cerradomys
- Species: C. marinhus

Binomial name
- Cerradomys marinhus (Bonvicino, 2003)

Synonyms
- Oryzomys marinhus Bonvicino, 2003 [Cerradomys] marinhus: Weksler, Percequillo, and Voss, 2006

Species of rodent

Cerradomys marinhus, also known as Marinho's rice rat, is a rodent species from South America. It is found in Minas Gerais, Brazil. It was formerly known as Oryzomys marinhus, but was transferred to the new genus Cerradomys in 2006.

Cerradomys marinhus is a brown rat with black lines along its back, a gray- to yellowish-buff venter, and a bicolored, scarcely-haired tail. It measures 153 to 179 millimetres (6.0 to 7.0 inches) in length, not including the tail which is an additional 198 to 212 mm (7.8 to 8.3 in). Its skull is robust and large. The species' diploid chromosome number is 56. All that is known about its reproduction is that pregnant rats have been found during both dry and rainy seasons, and in each case 2 to 4 embryos were present.

The preferred habitat of C. marinhus is cerrado in flooded grasslands and semideciduous forest.

== Literature cited ==
- Musser, G. G.; Carleton, M. D. (2005). "Superfamily Muroidea". In Wilson, D. E.; Reeder, D. M. (eds.). Mammal Species of the World: A Taxonomic and Geographic Reference (3rd ed.). Johns Hopkins University Press. p. 1124. ISBN 978-0-8018-8221-0. OCLC 62265494.
- Percequillo, A.R.; Hingst-Zaher, E.; Bonvicino, C.R. (2008). "Systematic review of genus Cerradomys Weksler, Percequillo and Voss, 2006 (Rodentia: Cricetidae: Sigmodontinae: Oryzomyini), with description of two new species from Eastern Brazil". American Museum Novitates (3622): 1–46. hdl:2246/5927.
- Weksler, M.; Percequillo, A. R.; Voss, R. S. (2006-10-19). "Ten new genera of oryzomyine rodents (Cricetidae: Sigmodontinae)". American Museum Novitates (3537). American Museum of Natural History: 1–29. doi:10.1206/0003-0082(2006)3537[1:TNGOOR]2.0.CO;2. hdl:2246/5815. S2CID 84088556.
- Pardiñas, Ulyses; Myers, Phil; León-Paniagua, Livia; Garza, Nicté Ordóñez; Cook, Joseph; Kryštufek, Boris; Haslauer, Rudolf; Bradley, Robert; Shenbrot, Gregory; Patton, Jim (2017). "Family Cricetidae (True Hamsters, Voles, Lemmings and New World Rats and Mice)". In Wilson, D.E.; Lacher, T.E.; Mittermeier, R.A. (eds.). Handbook of the Mammals of the World. Vol. 7. Rodents II. Lynx Edicions. pp. 204–535. ISBN 978-84-16728-04-6.
