= Edith's leaf-eared mouse =

Conservation status
- Data Deficient (IUCN 3.1)

Scientific classification
- Kingdom: Animalia
- Phylum: Chordata
- Class: Mammalia
- Infraclass: Placentalia
- Order: Rodentia
- Family: Cricetidae
- Subfamily: Sigmodontinae
- Genus: Graomys
- Species: G. edithae

Binomial name
- Graomys edithae Thomas, 1919

Species of rodent

Edith's leaf-eared mouse (Graomys edithae) is a species of rodent in the family Cricetidae. It is known only from Argentina, where it was found in a montane grassland on Otro Cerro at an elevation of 3000 m.
