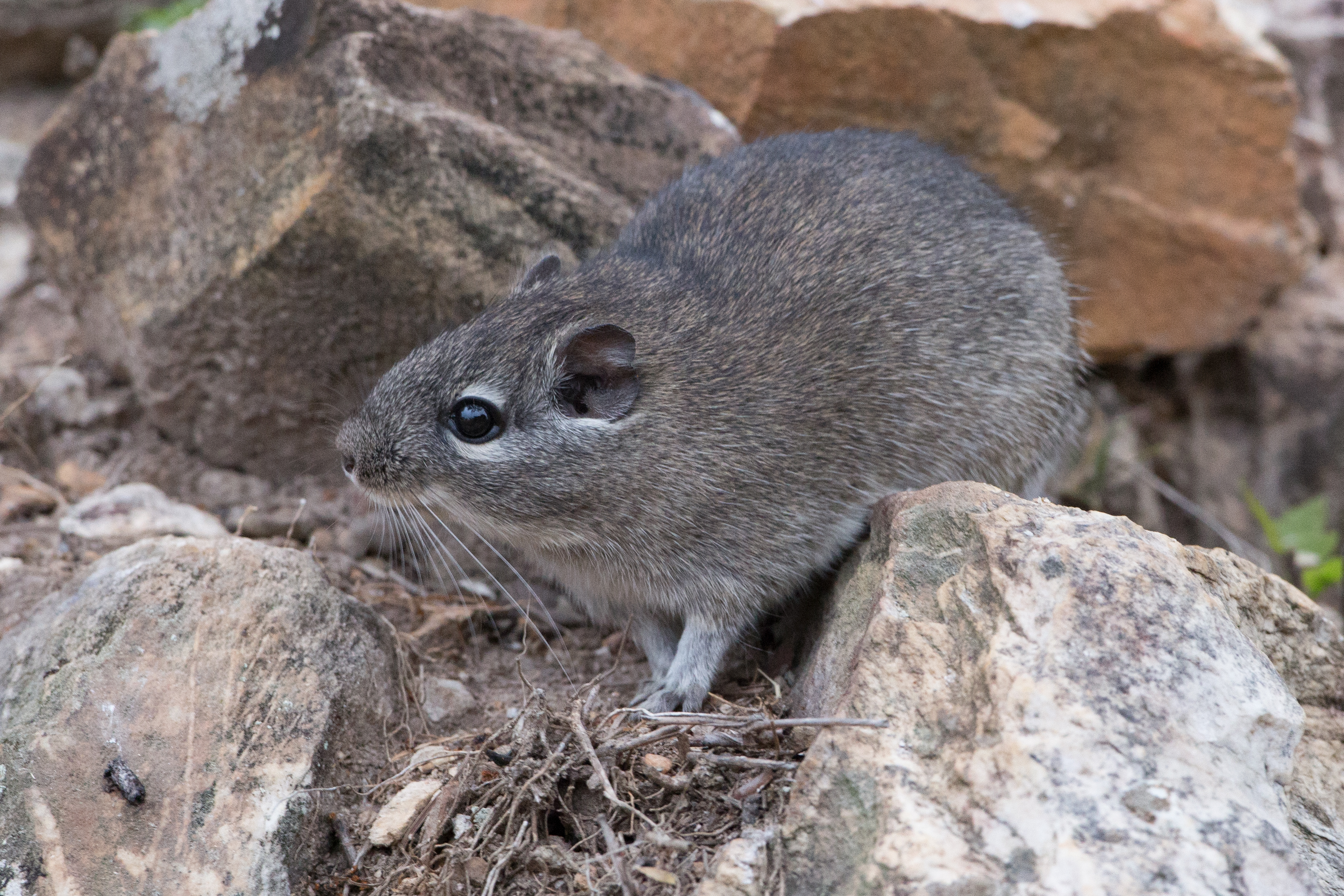
- Thrichomys apereoides

Scientific classification
- Kingdom: Animalia
- Phylum: Chordata
- Class: Mammalia
- Infraclass: Placentalia
- Order: Rodentia
- Family: Echimyidae
- Subfamily: Echimyinae
- Tribe: Myocastorini
- Genus: Thrichomys; Trouessart, 1880

Type species
- Nelomys apereoides Lund, 1839

Species
- Thrichomys apereoides Thrichomys fosteri Thrichomys inermis Thrichomys laurentius Thrichomys pachyurus
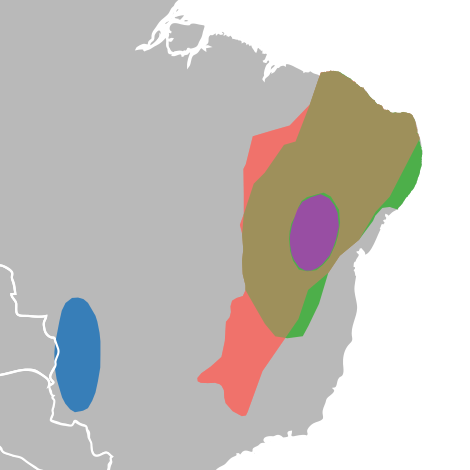
- Thrichomys distribution T. pachyurus in blue, T. apereoides in red, T. laurentius in green (yellow where overlapping apereoides), T. inermis in purple (entirely overlaps laurentius)

= Thrichomys =

Genus of mammals belonging to the spiny rat family of rodents

Thrichomys is a genus of South American rodents in the family Echimyidae. It contains at least five species, found in Bolivia, Brazil and Paraguay. They are as follows:

- Thrichomys apereoides - Common punaré
- Thrichomys fosteri - Foster's punaré
- Thrichomys inermis - Highlands punaré
- Thrichomys laurentius - Sao Lourenço punaré
- Thrichomys pachyurus - Paraguayan punaré

== Phylogeny ==
The closest relatives of the genus Thrichomys are two clades consisting of pairs of Myocastorini genera: Callistomys (the painted tree-rat) and Myocastor (the coypu or nutria) in one clade, and Hoplomys (the armored rat) and Proechimys in the other.

Genus-level cladogram of the Myocastorini

- Myocastorini
  - Thrichomys (punaré)
  - - Callistomys (painted tree-rat)
    - Myocastor (nutria)
  - - Hoplomys (armored rat)
    - Proechimys

The cladogram has been reconstructed from mitochondrial and nuclear DNA characters.
