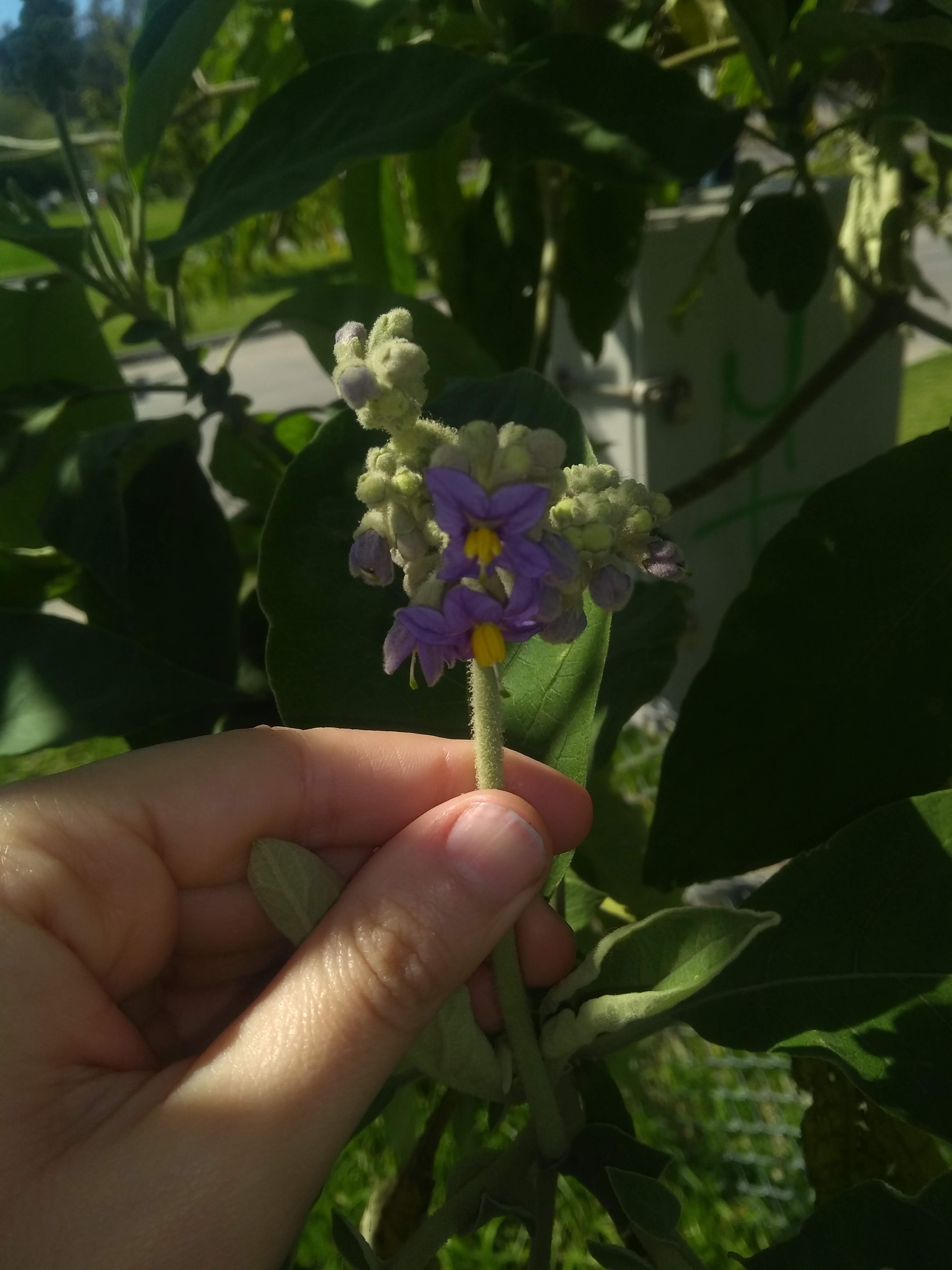

Conservation status
- Least Concern (IUCN 3.1)

Scientific classification
- Kingdom: Plantae
- Clade: Tracheophytes
- Clade: Angiosperms
- Clade: Eudicots
- Clade: Asterids
- Order: Solanales
- Family: Solanaceae
- Genus: Solanum
- Species: S. granulosoleprosum

Binomial name
- Solanum granulosoleprosum Dunal

Synonyms
- Solanum granuloso-leprosum Dunal (orth.var.); Solanum granulosum-leprosum Dunal (lapsus); Solanum verbascifolium f. granulosoleprosum (Dunal) Hassl.; Solanum verbascifolium f. eupulverulentum Hassl.; Solanum verbascifolium subf. intermedium Hassl.

= Solanum granulosoleprosum =

Species of tree

Solanum granulosoleprosum is a species of flowering plant in the family Solanaceae. It is small tree native to southern Brazil, Paraguay, Uruguay, and northern Argentina. It likes sunny conditions in arid lands, being a pioneer tree that prepares the soil for other plants.
