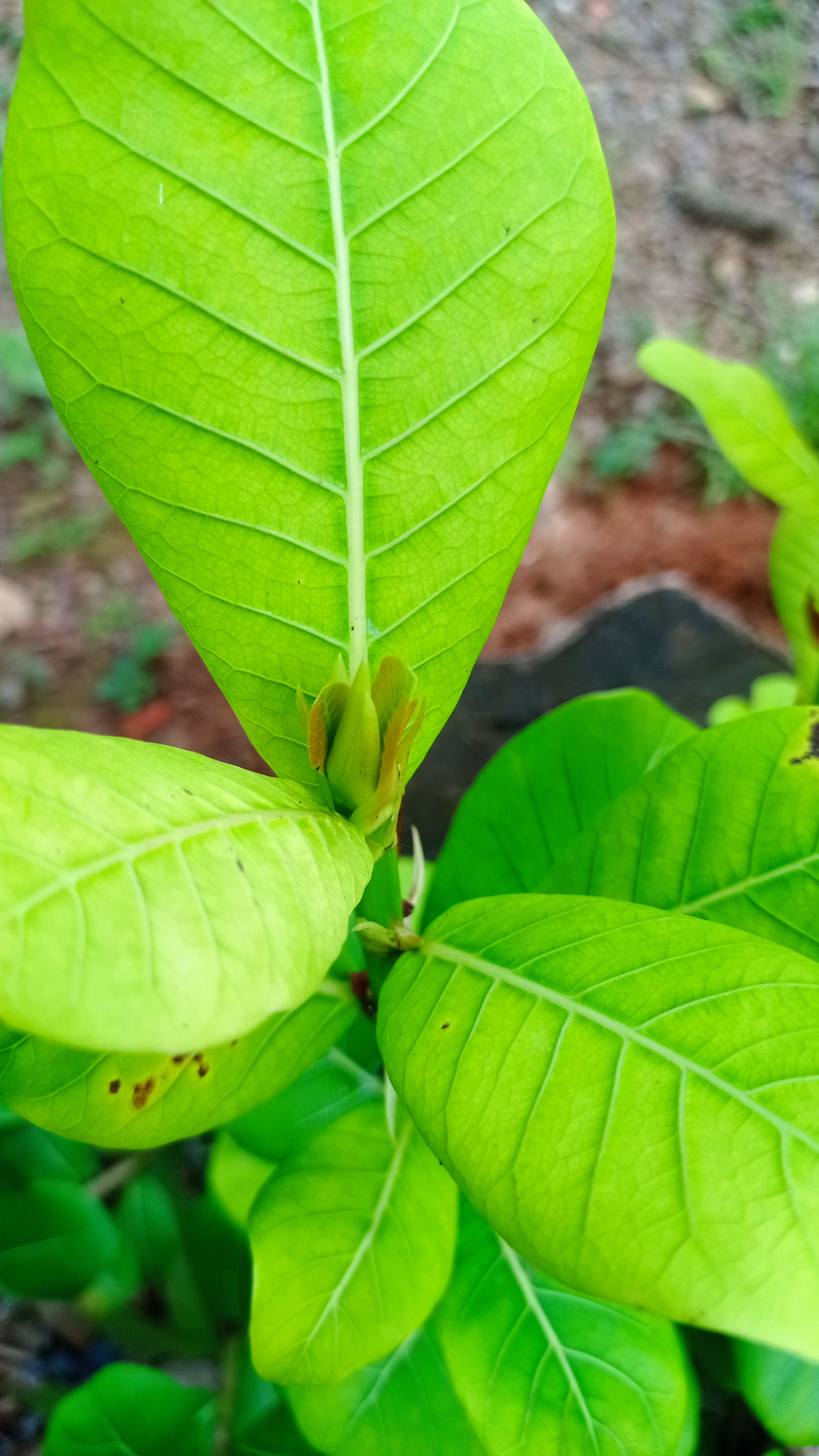

Conservation status
- Least Concern (IUCN 3.1)

Scientific classification
- Kingdom: Plantae
- Clade: Tracheophytes
- Clade: Angiosperms
- Clade: Eudicots
- Clade: Rosids
- Order: Rosales
- Family: Moraceae
- Genus: Ficus
- Species: F. enormis

Binomial name
- Ficus enormis (Miq.) Miq.

Synonyms
- Ficus mexiae Standl.; Urostigma clusiifolium var. acutiusculum Miq.; Urostigma enorme Miq.

= Ficus enormis =

Species of plant

Ficus enormis is a species of flowering plant in the family Moraceae, native to Brazil. An evergreen fig tree reaching 14 m (46 ft), it is an epiphyte (especially on palms) and lithophyte that can handle dense shade to full sun.
