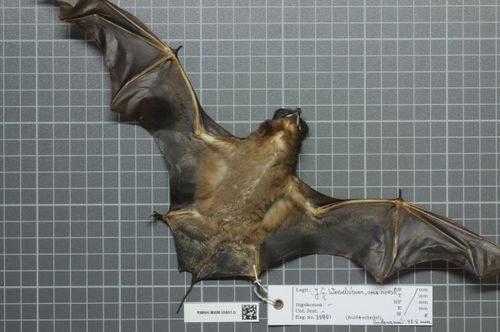
- Promops centralis, collected in Suriname by the Naturalis Biodiversity Center

Conservation status
- Least Concern (IUCN 3.1)

Scientific classification
- Kingdom: Animalia
- Phylum: Chordata
- Class: Mammalia
- Order: Chiroptera
- Family: Molossidae
- Genus: Promops
- Species: P. centralis

Binomial name
- Promops centralis Thomas, 1915
- Big crested mastiff bat range

= Big crested mastiff bat =

Species of bat

The big crested mastiff bat (Promops centralis) is a species of bat native to Central and South America.

== Taxonomy ==
It was described as a new species in 1915 by British zoologist Oldfield Thomas. The holotype was collected by George F. Gaumer, and presented to Thomas by Osbert Salvin.

== Description ==
It can be differentiated from the other species of Promops, the brown mastiff bat, by its longer forearm. The brown mastiff bat has a forearm length less than 50 mm (2.0 in), while the big crested mastiff bat has one greater than 51.5 mm (2.03 in). It has a dental formula of 1.1.2.32.1.2.3 for a total of 30 teeth.

== Biology and ecology ==
It is a social animal, roosting in small colonies of up to 6 individuals during the day. These roosts consist of the space underneath tree bark, the undersides of palm leaves, or tree hollows. Its search calls have an average duration of 20.6 ms, with a starting frequency of 23.0 kHz, an ending frequency of 25.6 kHz, and a peak frequency of 24.7 kHz.

== Range and habitat ==
The big crested mastiff bat is found in Central and South America. It is found in Argentina, Belize, Bolivia, Brazil, Colombia, Ecuador, El Salvador, French Guiana, Guatemala, Guyana, Honduras, Mexico, Nicaragua, Paraguay, Peru, Suriname, Trinidad and Tobago, and Venezuela. It is found at a range of elevations, from sea level to 1,800 m (5,900 ft).
