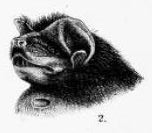

Scientific classification
- Domain: Eukaryota
- Kingdom: Animalia
- Phylum: Chordata
- Class: Mammalia
- Order: Chiroptera
- Family: Molossidae
- Genus: Promops; Gervais, 1856

Type species
- Promops ursinus Gervais, 1856

Species
- See text

= Promops =

Genus of bats

Promops is a genus of free-tailed bats.

== Species ==
- Promops centralis - big crested mastiff bat
- Promops davisoni
- Promops nasutus - brown mastiff bat
