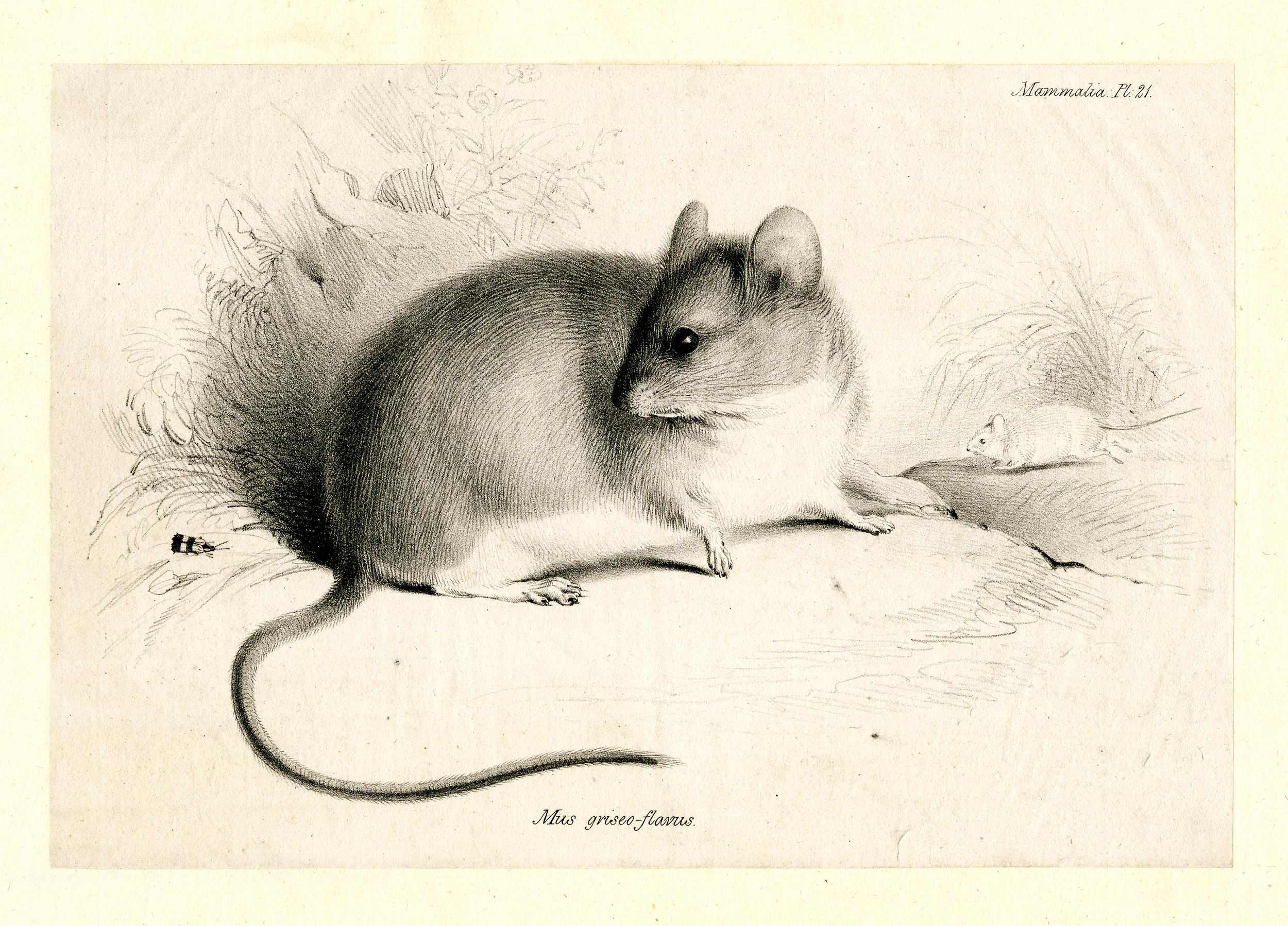
- Graomys griseoflavus

Scientific classification
- Kingdom: Animalia
- Phylum: Chordata
- Class: Mammalia
- Order: Rodentia
- Family: Cricetidae
- Subfamily: Sigmodontinae
- Tribe: Phyllotini
- Genus: Graomys; Thomas, 1916

Type species
- Mus griseoflavus

Species
- Graomys centralis Graomys domorum Graomys edithae Graomys griseoflavus

= Graomys =

Graomys Temporal range: Late Pliocene to Recent

Genus of rodents

Graomys is a genus of rodent in the family Cricetidae. It contains the following species:

- Central leaf-eared mouse (Graomys chacoensis)
- Pale leaf-eared mouse (Graomys domorum)
- Edith's leaf-eared mouse (Graomys edithae)
- Gray leaf-eared mouse (Graomys griseoflavus)
