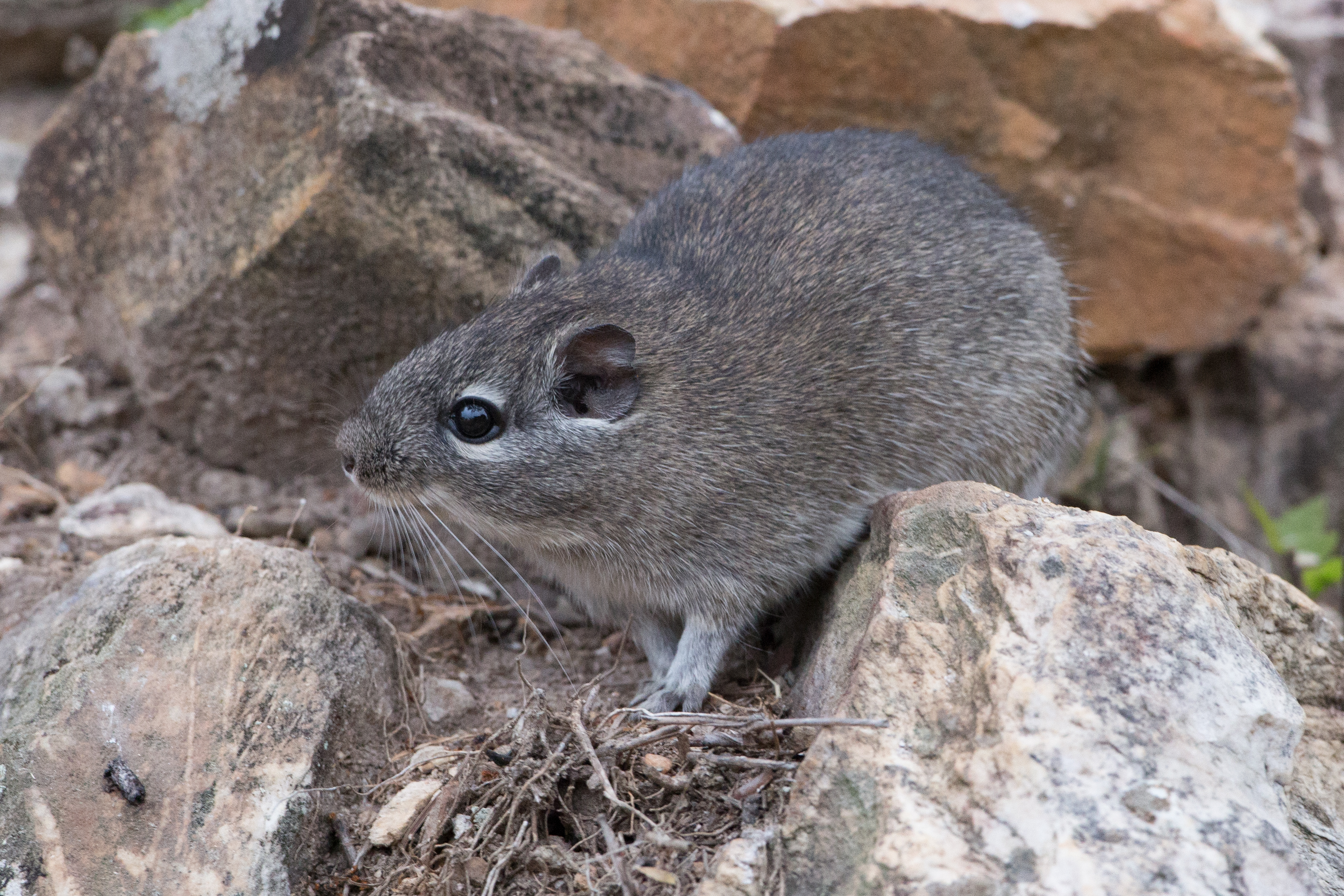

Conservation status
- Least Concern (IUCN 3.1)

Scientific classification
- Kingdom: Animalia
- Phylum: Chordata
- Class: Mammalia
- Order: Rodentia
- Family: Echimyidae
- Subfamily: Echimyinae
- Tribe: Myocastorini
- Genus: Thrichomys
- Species: T. apereoides

Binomial name
- Thrichomys apereoides (Lund, 1839)

Subspecies
- T. a. apereoides T. a. laurenteus
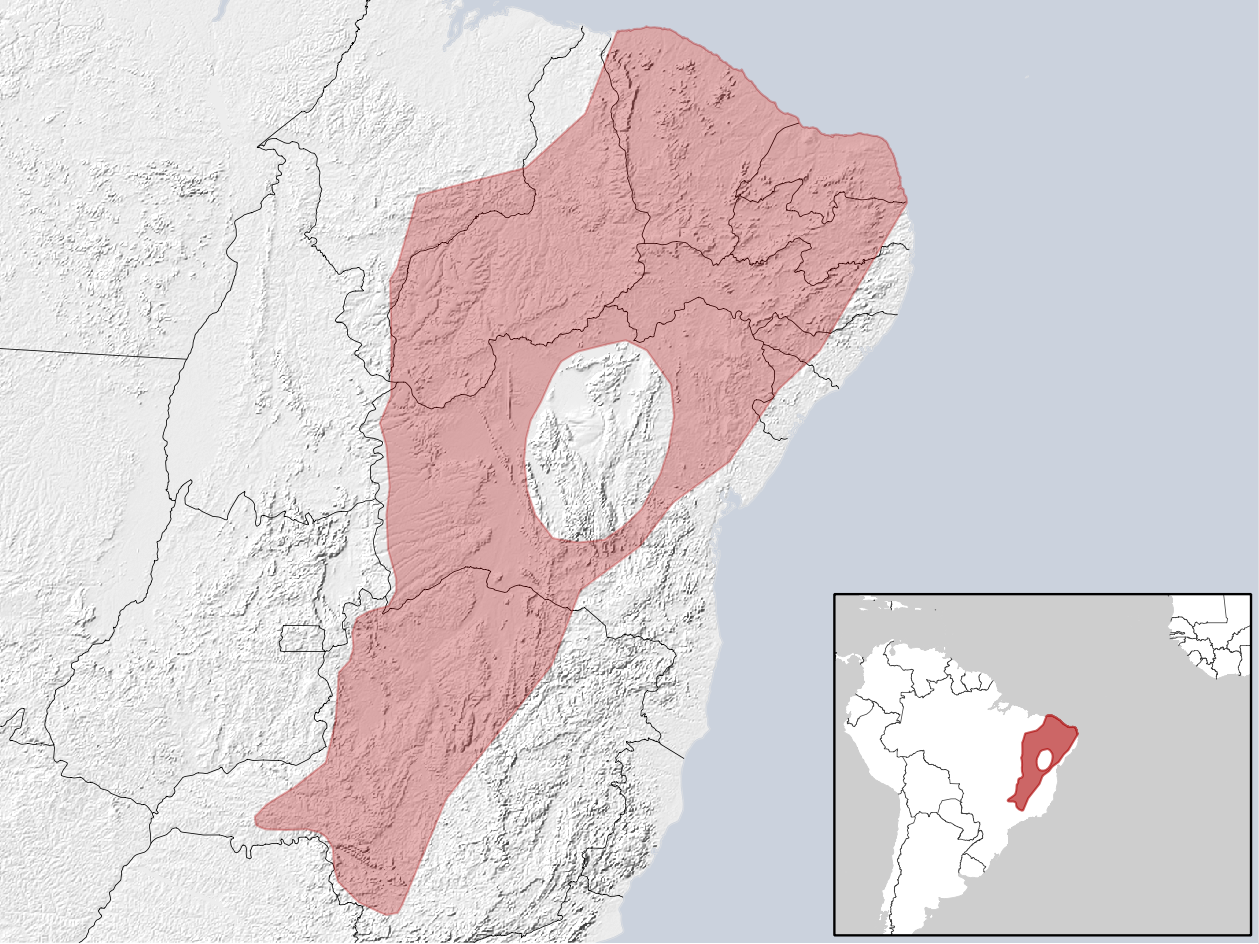

Synonyms
- Nelomys apereoides Cercomys cunicularius

= Common punaré =

Species of mammals in the spiny rat family of rodents

The common punaré (Thrichomys apereoides), is a species of spiny rat endemic to Brazil.

== Description ==
Like other members of the genus Thrichomys, but unlike all other species of spiny rat, common punarés have no spines, and instead have a thick pelt of soft fur, which also extends for the full length of the tail. The fur is greyish-brown over most of the body, with whitish underparts and ears. There are also three pairs of small white spots on the face; one each above and below the eyes, and one at the base of the ears.

They are the size of a large rat, measuring 23 to 26 cm (9.1 to 10.2 in) in length, not counting the 18 to 23 cm (7.1 to 9.1 in) tail. On average, they weigh 340 g (12 oz), although males are slightly larger than females. Females have four teats, with one pair just behind the forelegs, and another in front of the hips.

== Distribution and habitat ==
The common punaré is found only in eastern Brazil, where it inhabits a belt of relatively open caatinga and cerrado vegetation between the Amazonian and Atlantic Forests. It is found from the coasts of Ceará and Rio Grande do Norte through all of the other states of the Northeast Region, and across much of Minas Gerais in the south. Within this region, it inhabits mainly dry and rocky habitats.

Although it was formerly thought that there were as many as five subspecies, some of these are now regarded as entirely separate species, and only two subspecies are still recognised:

- Thrichomys apereoides apereoides - southern part of range
- Thrichomys apereoides laurenteus - northern part of range

== Behaviour and biology ==
Common punarés are active mainly around dawn, resting for the rest of the day in nests among rocky boulders, or taking temporary refuge in any available crevice. They inhabit home ranges of 1,800 to 2,000 m^{2} (19,000 to 22,000 sq ft), defending them from rivals using a combination of erect and semi-erect threat displays, kicking, wrestling, and chasing. They are agile animals, easily able to clamber through rugged and rocky terrain, and are also able to climb trees.

They are herbivorous, and able to survive without drinking for at least eighteen days under laboratory conditions. In the wild, they can obtain additional water by eating prickly pear cactuses. They breed throughout the year, giving birth to a litter of, on average, three pups, after a gestation of about 97 days. The young weigh about 21 g (0.74 oz) at birth, and are born with open eyes and a full coat of fur. They begin to eat solid food within a few hours of birth, but are not fully weaned until about 28 days of age.
