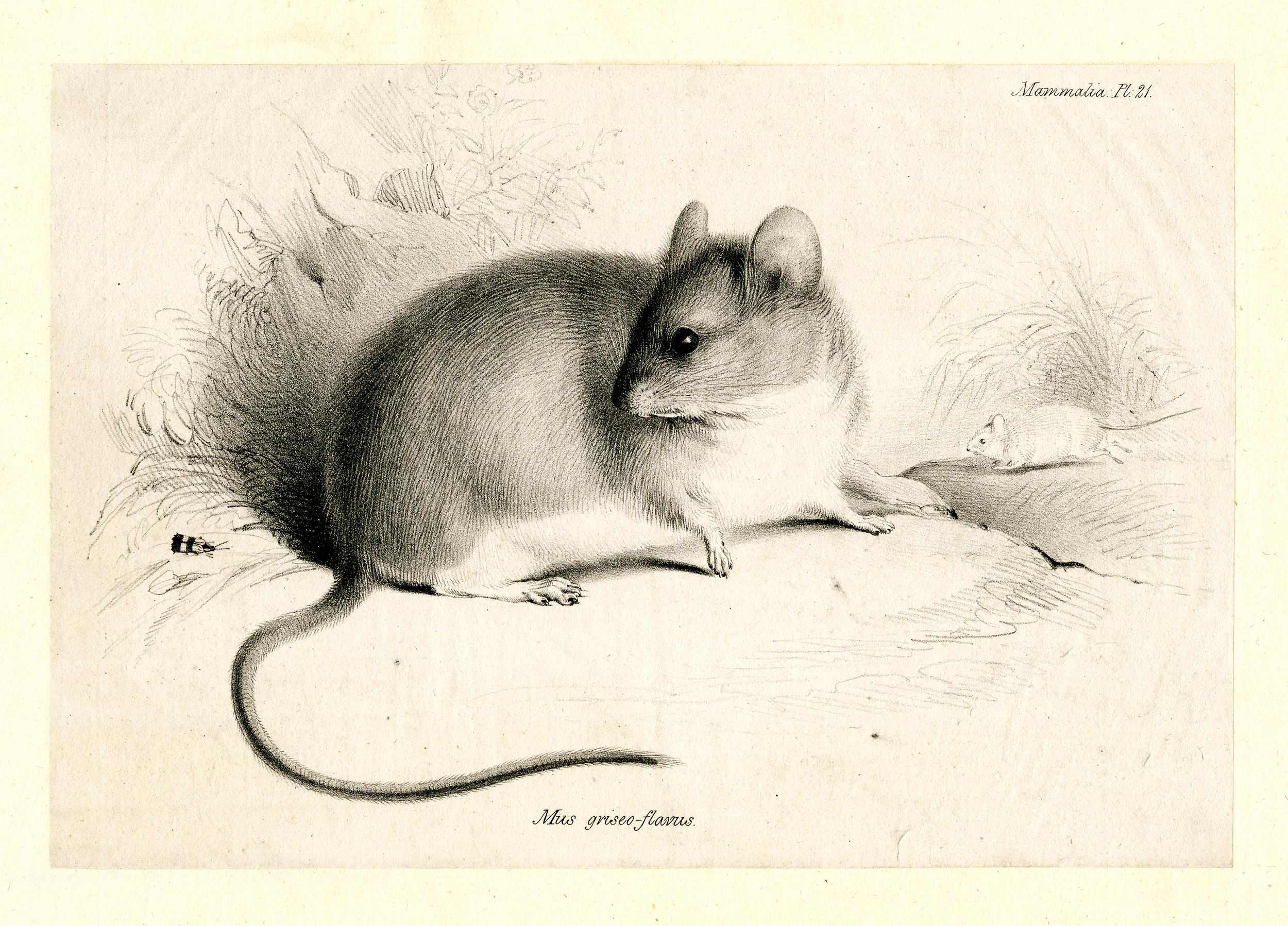

Conservation status
- Least Concern (IUCN 3.1)

Scientific classification
- Kingdom: Animalia
- Phylum: Chordata
- Class: Mammalia
- Order: Rodentia
- Family: Cricetidae
- Subfamily: Sigmodontinae
- Genus: Graomys
- Species: G. griseoflavus

Binomial name
- Graomys griseoflavus Waterhouse, 1837

Synonyms
- Mus griseo-flavus Phyllotis griseo-flavus

= Gray leaf-eared mouse =

Species of rodent

The gray leaf-eared mouse (Graomys griseoflavus) is a rodent species from South America. It is found in Argentina, Bolivia, Brazil and Paraguay; its habitat includes the Gran Chaco.

This is a variable and widely distributed species that can be found in many habitat types. It is considered to be a species complex, and some populations might be considered separate species. Genus Graomys contains species once considered to be part of the complex.
