= Brown mastiff bat =

Conservation status
- Least Concern (IUCN 3.1)

Scientific classification
- Domain: Eukaryota
- Kingdom: Animalia
- Phylum: Chordata
- Class: Mammalia
- Order: Chiroptera
- Family: Molossidae
- Genus: Promops
- Species: P. nasutus

Binomial name
- Promops nasutus Spix, 1823
- Brown mastiff bat range

Species of mammal

The brown mastiff bat (Promops nasutus) is a species of bat in the family Molossidae. It is found in Venezuela, Trinidad, Guyana, Suriname, Brazil, Bolivia, Paraguay, Argentina and northern Colombia.
