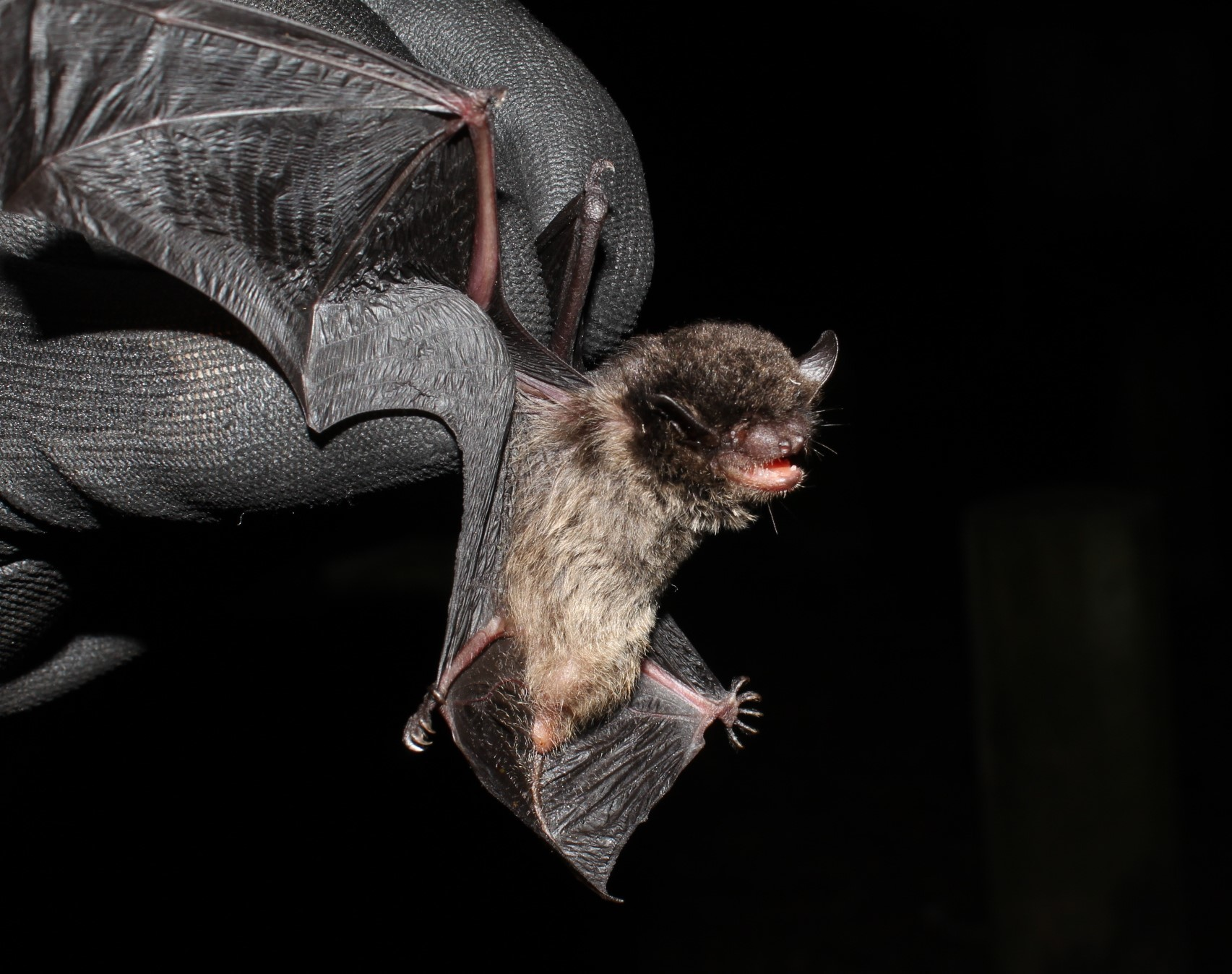
- A diminutive serotine bat being held as part of a survey in Brasil

Conservation status
- Least Concern (IUCN 3.1)

Scientific classification
- Domain: Eukaryota
- Kingdom: Animalia
- Phylum: Chordata
- Class: Mammalia
- Order: Chiroptera
- Family: Vespertilionidae
- Genus: Eptesicus
- Species: E. diminutus

Binomial name
- Eptesicus diminutus Osgood, 1915

= Diminutive serotine =

Species of bat

The diminutive serotine (Eptesicus diminutus) is a bat species found in Argentina, Colombia, Brazil, Paraguay, Uruguay, and Venezuela.
