= Cerradomys subflavus =

Conservation status
- Least Concern (IUCN 3.1)

Scientific classification
- Kingdom: Animalia
- Phylum: Chordata
- Class: Mammalia
- Order: Rodentia
- Family: Cricetidae
- Subfamily: Sigmodontinae
- Genus: Cerradomys
- Species: C. subflavus

Binomial name
- Cerradomys subflavus (Wagner, 1842)

Synonyms
- Mus vulpinus Lund, 1840; Hesperomys subflavus Wagner, 1842; Mus vulpinoides Schinz, 1845; Oryzomys subflavus: Thomas, 1901 [Cerradomys] subflavus: Weksler, Percequillo, and Voss, 2006

Species of rodent

Cerradomys subflavus, also known as the terraced rice rat or flavescent oryzomys, is a rodent species from South America in the genus Cerradomys. It is found in the states of Goiás, São Paulo, and Minas Gerais, Brazil. Populations in Bolivia, Paraguay, and elsewhere in Brazil that were previously placed in this species are now classified as various other species of Cerradomys.

== Literature cited ==
- Musser, G.G. and Carleton, M.D. 2005. Superfamily Muroidea. Pp. 894–1531 in Wilson, D.E. and Reeder, D.M. (eds.). Mammal Species of the World: a taxonomic and geographic reference. 3rd ed. Baltimore: The Johns Hopkins University Press, 2 vols., 2142 pp. ISBN 978-0-8018-8221-0
- Percequillo, A. and Langguth, A. 2008. Cerradomys subflavus. In IUCN. IUCN Red List of Threatened Species. Downloaded on April 24, 2009.
- Percequillo, A.R., E. Hingst-Zaher, and C.R. Bonvicino. 2008. Systematic review of genus Cerradomys Weksler, Percequillo and Voss, 2006 (Rodentia: Cricetidae: Sigmodontinae: Oryzomyini), with description of two new species from Eastern Brazil. American Museum Novitates 3622: 1–46.
- Weksler, M.; Percequillo, A. R.; Voss, R. S. (2006-10-19). "Ten new genera of oryzomyine rodents (Cricetidae: Sigmodontinae)". American Museum Novitates (3537). American Museum of Natural History: 1–29. doi:10.1206/0003-0082(2006)3537[1:TNGOOR]2.0.CO;2. hdl:2246/5815. S2CID 84088556.
