= List of mammals of Tijuca National Park =

There are at least 62 species of mammals known to occur in the Tijuca National Park in the city of Rio de Janeiro in Brazil.

== Infraclass: Eutheria ==
=== Order: Chiroptera ===
- Family: Molossidae
  - Genus: Cynomops
    - Cinnamon dog-faced bat, Cynomops abrasus
  - Genus: Molossus
    - Velvety free-tailed bat, Molossus molossus
    - Black mastiff bat, Molossus rufus
  - Genus: Tadarida
    - Brazilian free-tailed bat, Tadarida brasiliensis
  - Genus: Nyctinomops
    - Big free-tailed bat, Nyctinomops macrotis
  - Genus: Eumops
    - Black bonneted bat, Eumops auripendulus
- Family: Vespertilionidae
  - Genus: Eptesicus
    - Brazilian brown bat, Eptesicus brasiliensis
    - Diminutive serotine, Eptesicus diminutus
    - Argentine brown bat, Eptesicus furinalis
  - Genus: Histiotus
    - Tropical big-eared brown bat, Histiotus velatus
  - Genus: Lasiurus
    - Southern yellow bat, Lasiurus ega
    - Hoary bat, Lasiurus cinereus
  - Genus: Myotis
    - Silver-tipped myotis, Myotis albescens
    - Black myotis, Myotis nigricans
    - Red myotis, Myotis ruber
- Family: Phyllostomidae
    - Genus: Lonchophylla
      - Godman's nectar bat, Lonchophylla mordax
    - Genus: Micronycteris
      - Little big-eared bat, Micronycteris megalotis
      - White-bellied big-eared bat, Micronycteris minuta
    - Genus: Mimon
      - Golden bat, Mimon bennettii
    - Genus: Phylloderma
      - Pale-faced bat, Phylloderma stenops
    - Genus: Phyllostomus
      - Pale spear-nosed bat, Phyllostomus discolor
      - Greater spear-nosed bat, Phyllostomus hastatus
    - Genus: Tonatia
      - Greater round-eared bat, Tonatia bidens
    - Genus: Lophostoma
      - White-throated round-eared bat, Lophostoma silvicola
    - Genus: Anoura
      - Tailed tailless bat, Anoura caudifer
      - Geoffroy's tailless bat, Anoura geoffroyi
    - Genus: Glossophaga
      - Pallas's long-tongued bat, Glossophaga soricina
  - Genus: Carollia
    - Seba's short-tailed bat, Carollia perspicillata
    - Genus: Artibeus
      - Fringed fruit-eating bat, Artibeus fimbriatus
      - Great fruit-eating bat, Artibeus lituratus
      - Dark fruit-eating bat, Artibeus obscurus
    - Genus: Dermanura
      - Gervais's fruit-eating bat, Dermanura cinerea
    - Genus: Chiroderma
      - Brazilian big-eyed bat, Chiroderma doriae
      - Hairy big-eyed bat, Chiroderma villosum
    - Genus: Platyrrhinus
      - White-lined broad-nosed bat, Platyrrhinus lineatus
    - Genus: Vampyressa
      - Southern little yellow-eared bat, Vampyressa pusilla
    - Genus: Desmodus
      - Common vampire bat, Desmodus rotundus
    - Genus: Diaemus
      - White-winged vampire bat, Diaemus youngii
    - Genus: Diphylla
      - Hairy-legged vampire bat, Diphylla ecaudata
    - Genus: Pygoderma
      - Ipanema bat, Pygoderma bilabiatum
    - Genus: Sturnira
      - Little yellow-shouldered bat, Sturnira lilium
- Family: Noctilionidae
    - Greater bulldog bat, Noctilio leporinus

=== Order: Primates ===
- Family: Callitrichidae
  - Genus: Callithrix
    - Common marmoset, Callithrix jacchus (introduced)
- Family: Cebidae
  - Genus: Saimiri
    - Common squirrel monkey, Saimiri sciureus (introduced)
  - Genus: Sapajus
    - Black capuchin, Sapajus nigritus

=== Order: Rodentia ===
- Family: Sciuridae
  - Genus: Sciurus
    - Ingram's squirrel, Sciurus ingrami
- Family: Muridae
  - Genus: Rattus
    - Black rat, Rattus rattus (introduced)
- Family: Cricetidae
  - Genus: Oxymycterus
    - Atlantic Forest hocicudo, Oxymycterus dasytrichus
- Family: Cuniculidae
  - Genus: Cuniculus
    - Lowland paca, Cuniculus paca
- Family: Dasyproctidae
  - Genus: Dasyprocta
    - Azara's agouti, Dasyprocta azarae
- Family: Erethizontidae
  - Genus: Coendou
    - Paraguaian hairy dwarf porcupine, Coendou villosus
- Family: Echimyidae
  - Genus: Trinomys
    - Soft-spined Atlantic spiny rat, Trinomys dimidiatus

=== Order: Lagomorpha ===
- Family: Leporidae
  - Genus: Sylvilagus
    - Brazilian cottontail, Sylvilagus brasiliensis

=== Order: Pilosa ===
- Family: Myrmecophagidae
  - Genus: Tamandua
    - Southern tamandua, Tamandua tetradactyla
- Family: Bradypodidae
  - Genus: Bradypus
    - Brown-throated sloth, Bradypus variegatus

=== Order: Cingulata ===
  - Genus: Dasypus
    - Nine-banded armadillo, Dasypus novemcinctus

=== Order: Carnivora ===
- Family: Canidae
  - Genus: Cerdocyon
    - Crab-eating fox, Cerdocyon thous
- Family: Procyonidae
  - Genus: Nasua
    - South American coati, Nasua nasua
  - Genus: Procyon
    - Crab-eating raccoon, Procyon cancrivorus
- Family: Felidae
  - Genus: Leopardus
    - Margay, Leopardus wiedii (unconfirmed)

== Infraclass: Metatheria ==
=== Order: Didelphimorphia ===
- Family: Didelphidae
  - Genus: Caluromys
    - Bare-tailed woolly opossum, Caluromys philander
  - Genus: Chironectes
    - Water opossum, Chironectes minimus
  - Genus: Didelphis
    - Big-eared opossum, Didelphis aurita
  - Genus: Metachirus
    - Brown four-eyed opossum, Metachirus nudicaudatus
  - Genus: Marmosa
    - Woolly mouse opossum, Marmosa demerarae
  - Genus: Monodelphis
    - Northern three-striped opossum, Monodelphis americana
    - Southern three-striped opossum, Monodelphis theresa
  - Genus: Philander
    - Southeastern four-eyed opossum, Philander frenatus
