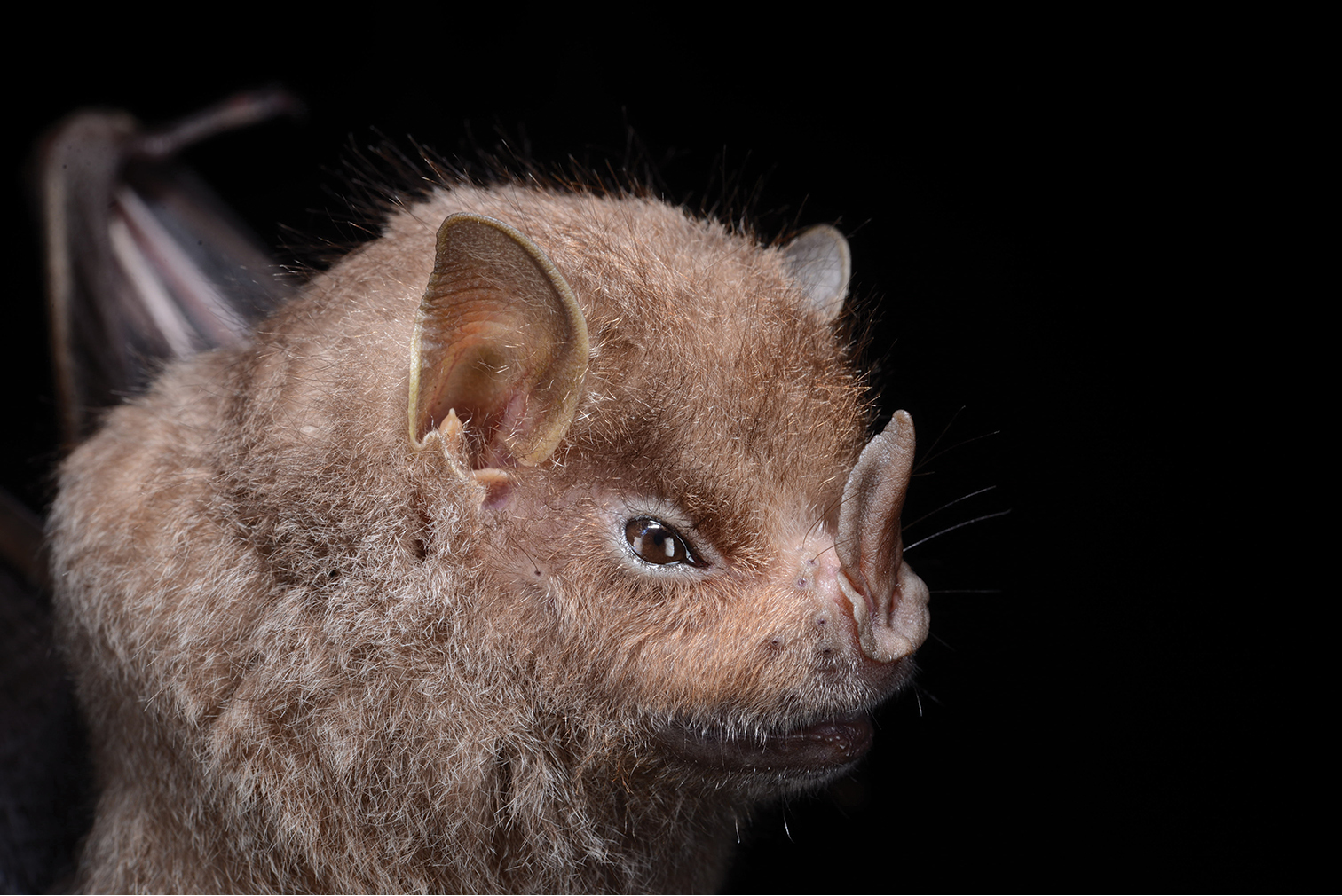

Conservation status
- Endangered (IUCN 3.1)

Scientific classification
- Kingdom: Animalia
- Phylum: Chordata
- Class: Mammalia
- Order: Chiroptera
- Family: Phyllostomidae
- Genus: Chiroderma
- Species: C. improvisum

Binomial name
- Chiroderma improvisum R.J Baker & Genoways, 1976

= Guadeloupe big-eyed bat =

Species of bat

The Guadeloupe big-eyed bat (Chiroderma improvisum) is a species of bat in the family Phyllostomidae. It is found in Guadeloupe and Montserrat. It is threatened by habitat loss mostly because of Hurricane Hugo, which destroyed 90% of its population in 1989. The species may be locally extinct in some areas of Guadeloupe.

== Taxonomy and etymology ==
The Guadeloupe big-eyed bat was described in 1976. The holotype was collected in July 1974 in Baie-Mahault commune of Basse-Terre Island. Its species name is of Latin origin and means "unforeseen" or "unexpected." Baker and Genoways chose this species name because they "did not expect to find Chiroderma on Guadeloupe because the nearest known representative from the Caribbean occurs on Trinidad and Tobago, 550 kilometers to the south."

Baker and Genoways, when initially describing the species, speculated that it might be closely related to the Brazilian big-eyed bat, and that the current two species were relicts of a single, once-widespread species. Conversely, in the same paper, they conceded that the two species may be similar to each other only through convergent evolution. However, in a 1994 study, Baker and others examined the mitochondrial DNA of the big-eyed bats and found that it is actually most closely related to the hairy big-eyed bat, which is its sister taxa. The Guadelouope big-eyed bat and the hairy big-eyed bat diverged from the Brazilian big-eyed bat and the little big-eyed bat around 2.6 million years ago. The Guadeloupe big-eyed bat then diverged from the hairy big-eyed bat 2.1 million years ago.

== Description ==
It is the largest member of its genus, Chiroderma. Its body length is 85–88 mm (3.3–3.5 in). Its forearm is 57.5 mm (2.26 in). Its nose-leaf is approximately 5.9 mm (0.23 in) long. Its hind foot is 15–17 mm (0.59–0.67 in) long, and its ear is 21–21.5 mm (0.83–0.85 in) long. Its fur has a woolly texture. Individual hairs are 10 mm (0.39 in) long on its back. Its hairs are mostly a pale brownish-gray; the bases of the hairs are darker, while the tips are a rich, dark brown. Some individuals have a distinct white stripe down their backs. In some individuals, the coloration of individual hairs is distinctly tricolored. Fur on its belly is grayish-brown, with individual hairs tipped in white.

== Biology ==
It is a diploid species, with 26 chromosomes. Its Fundamental number is 48. It is frugivorous. Little is known about its reproduction. A lactating female was once encountered in July. It is known to be parasitized by mites of the family Spinturnicidae (Periglischrus iheringi). This mite species is a common ectoparasite of leaf-nosed bats.

== Range and habitat ==
It has been documented on the islands of Guadeloupe and Montserrat, both of which are part of the Lesser Antilles of the Caribbean Sea. In 2016, it was documented for the first time on Saint Kitts Island, which is also part of the Lesser Antilles. This discovery expanded the known range of the species by 80 km (50 mi).

== Conservation ==
It is currently evaluated as endangered by the IUCN. The 2016 listing as endangered was an uplisting from its 2008 listing as vulnerable. In 2008, individuals of this species were captured in Montserrat, alleviating fears that it had gone extinct. Before this individual was captured, the last Guadeloupe big-eyed bat documented on Montserrat was in 1984. It is thought that the bat species of Montserrat could be threatened by dramatic natural events, such as hurricanes and volcanic eruptions.
