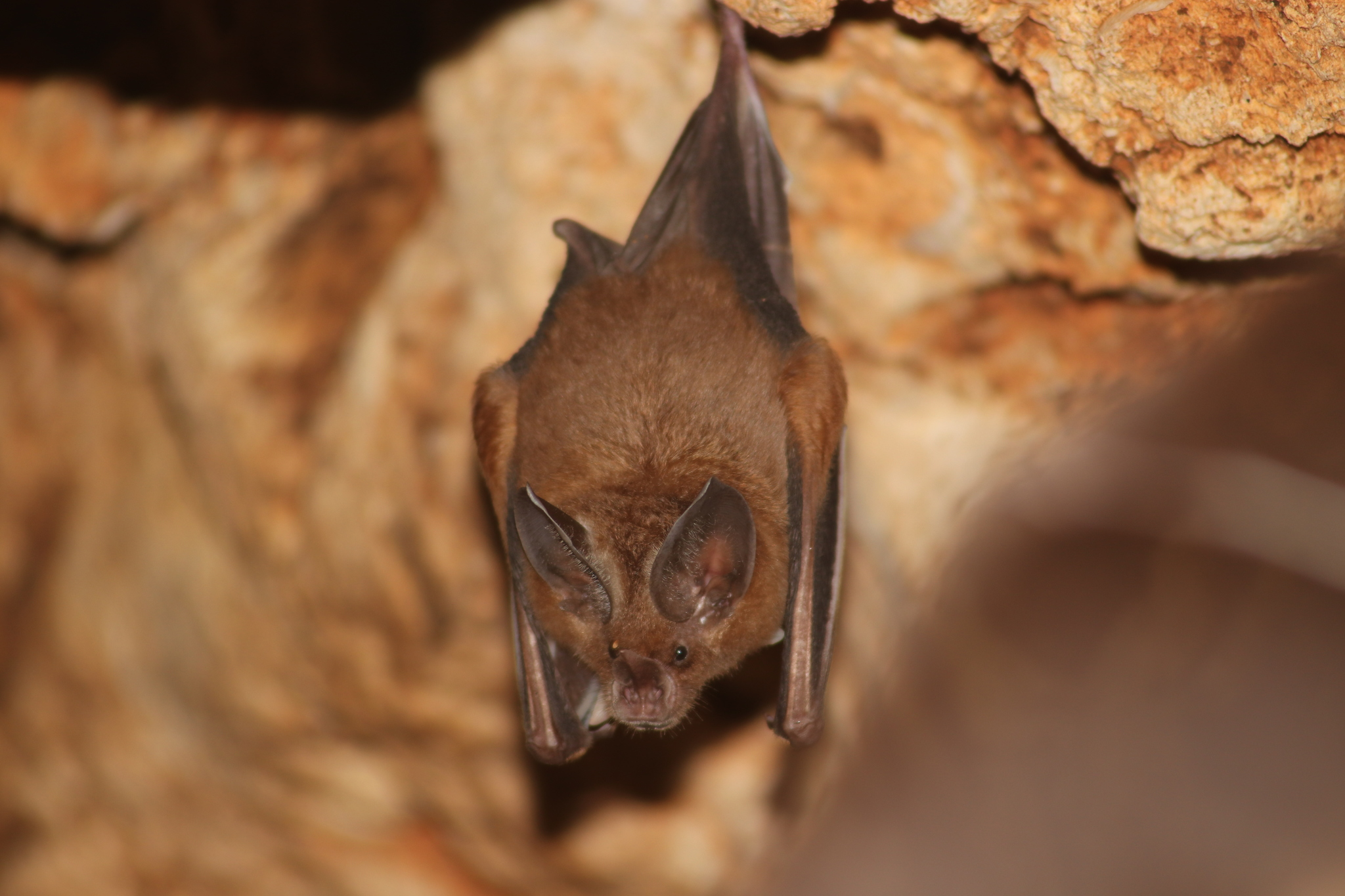

Conservation status
- Least Concern (IUCN 3.1)

Scientific classification
- Kingdom: Animalia
- Phylum: Chordata
- Class: Mammalia
- Order: Chiroptera
- Family: Phyllostomidae
- Genus: Mimon
- Species: M. cozumelae

Binomial name
- Mimon cozumelae Goldman, 1914
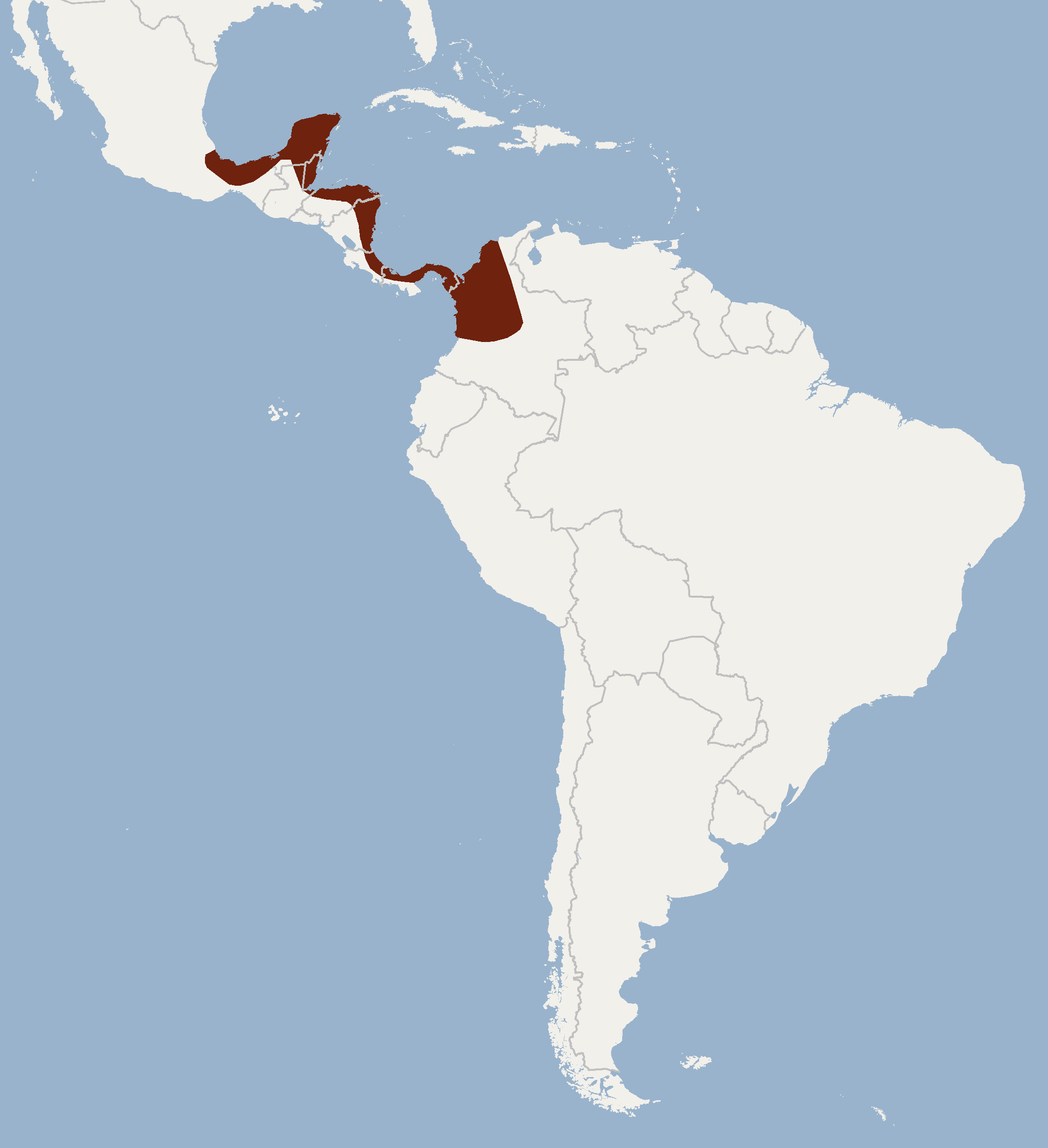

= Cozumelan golden bat =

Species of bat

The Cozumelan golden bat (Mimon cozumelae) is a bat species found in Mexico, Guatemala, Belize, Honduras, Nicaragua, Costa Rica, Panama and Colombia. At one time, this species was considered to be a subspecies of the golden bat (Mimon bennettii). Little is known about the biology of this bat, but it has a wide range, no particular threats have been identified, and the population seems steady, so the International Union for Conservation of Nature has assessed its conservation status as being of "the least concern".

== Taxonomy and etymology ==
It was described as a new species in 1914 by American zoologist Edward Alphonso Goldman. The holotype had been collected on Cozumel by G. F. Gaumer. At times, it has been considered a subspecies of the golden bat, Mimon bennettii.

== Description ==
Its forearm length is 53.1–59 mm (2.09–2.32 in). Individuals weigh approximately 35 g (1.2 oz). It has a dental formula of 2.1.2.31.1.2.3 for a total of 30 teeth.

== Biology and ecology ==
It roosts in small groups by day, mostly in limestone caves, but sometimes in hollow logs. It hunts at night and may glean prey from tree foliage. Its diet is known to include beetles, katydids, birds and lizards. Breeding takes place at the start of the rainy season, with females giving birth to a single offspring.

== Range and habitat ==
The Cozumelan golden bat is a lowland species and is found in mature evergreen, semi-deciduous, and dry forest. It has been documented at a range of elevations from 0–600 m (0–1,969 ft) above sea level.
