= Chiroderma vizottoi =

Conservation status
- Data Deficient (IUCN 3.1)

Scientific classification
- Kingdom: Animalia
- Phylum: Chordata
- Class: Mammalia
- Order: Chiroptera
- Family: Phyllostomidae
- Genus: Chiroderma
- Species: C. vizottoi

Binomial name
- Chiroderma vizottoi Taddei & Lim, 2010

Species of bat

Chiroderma vizottoi is a species of frugivorous bat found in the northeast of Brazil.

== Taxonomy ==
The species was described by Valdir Antonio Taddei and B. K. Lim in a study published in 2010, identifying specimens previously deposited at a research institution that were recognised as the sixth extant species of the genus. The collection date of the holotype is unknown, paratypes were collected in 1977 and 2000. The authors distinguished the new taxon by morphological characteristics, cranial features and dentition, and by speciation that emerged through geographical isolation.

The specific epithet commemorates the works of Luis Dino Vizotto's contributions toward an understanding of chiropteran systematics. The spelling of the epithet, as vizzotoi, was erroneously published by the IUCN.

== Description ==
A mid-sized species of Chiroderma, a genus of Phyllostomidae known as the big-eyed bats, most closely resembling the species Chiroderma doriae found across eastern and central Brazil. Forearm measurements range from 46.7 to 50.3 millimetres and the skull at its greatest length is 25.9-26.4 mm. The ventral side of the pelage is slightly paler than the back, a light brown to grey colour. The face bears distinctive striped markings. The fur at the top of the head is white, as is a midline stripe that extends from the shoulder to legs. The skull and body size is smaller than the congener C. doriae, and canines are longer.

== Distribution and habitat ==
Chiroderma vizottoi was thought to be restricted to locations at the northeastern state of Piauí in Brazil, but found to also occur at Ceará in the Caatinga ecoregion. The four known locations of specimens are from Caatinga forest habitat. The species does not overlap with others of the genus, three of which also occur in nearby regions.

As of 2019, it is evaluated as a data deficient species by the IUCN. It is unlisted in Brazil's national registers of protected species.
