= Lopinot Cave =

Lopinot Cave is a large cave in the Lopinot Valley in the Northern Range of Trinidad and Tobago. The Caves are home to the Oilbirds. These are the only nocturnal fruit eating birds in the world. They forage at night, navigating by echolocation in the same way as bats. It is a 1.5 hour drive from the capital

The cave is a large bat roost and has been used to study the behaviour of the Greater Spear-nosed Bat Phyllostomus hastatus
