= Luciana Whitaker =

Brazilian photographer (born 1965)

- Born: 20 January 1965
- Known for: Photography
- Awards: Conrad Wessel Award, Marc Ferrez Photography Award
- Website: https://lucianawhitaker.com

Luciana Whitaker (born 1965) is a Brazilian photographer and journalist based in Rio de Janeiro. She is known for her work documenting the Inupiat people during her stay at Barrow, Alaska, and for her work as an photojornalist at Folha de S.Paulo, whose subjects covered urban violence and political events. She was awarded the 2024 FCW Photography Prize and the 2024 Marc Ferrez Prize for her exhibit "Vestígios", which is set at Floresta Nacional da Tijuca.
