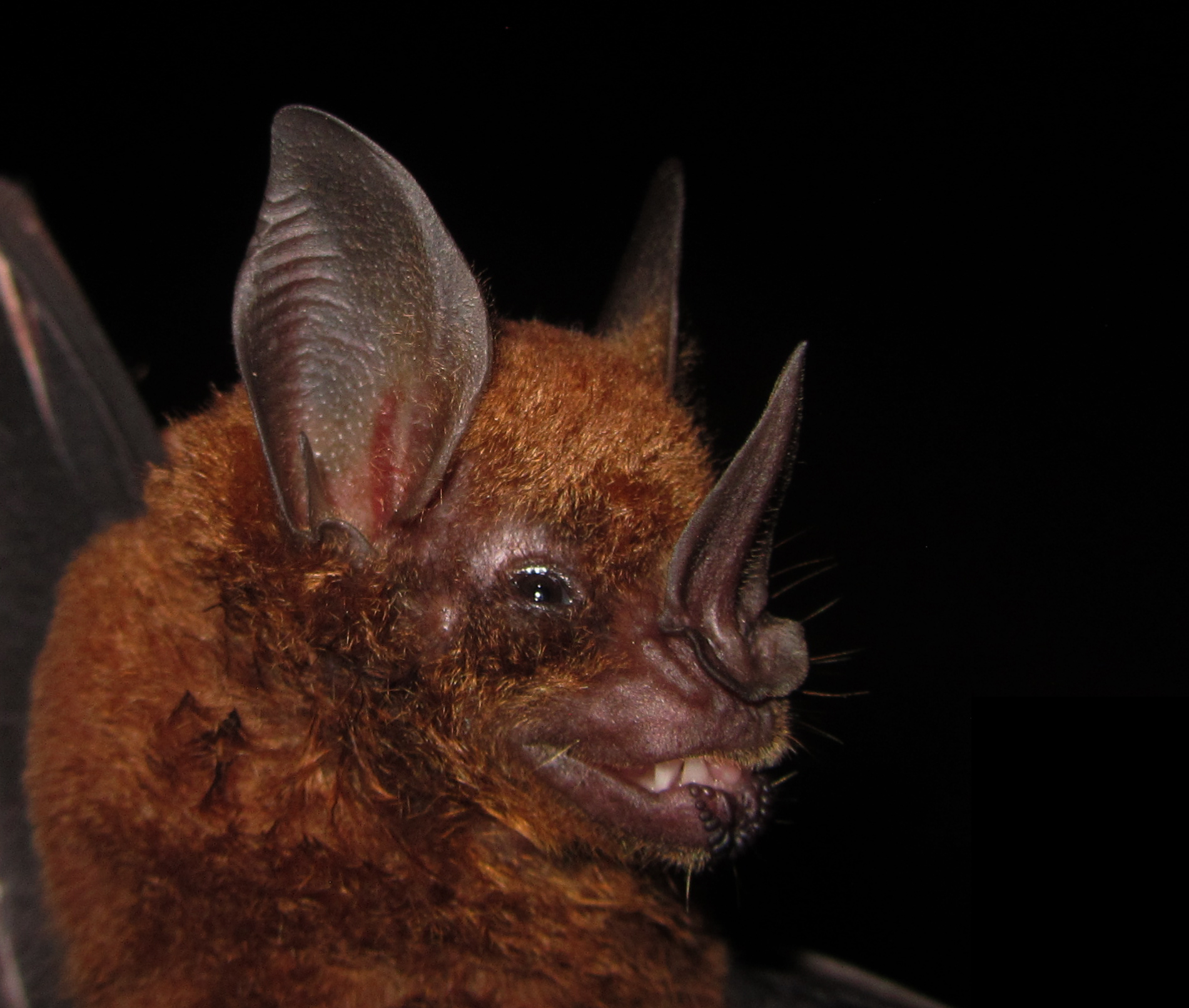

Conservation status
- Least Concern (IUCN 3.1)

Scientific classification
- Kingdom: Animalia
- Phylum: Chordata
- Class: Mammalia
- Order: Chiroptera
- Family: Phyllostomidae
- Genus: Phyllostomus
- Species: P. latifolius

Binomial name
- Phyllostomus latifolius Thomas, 1901
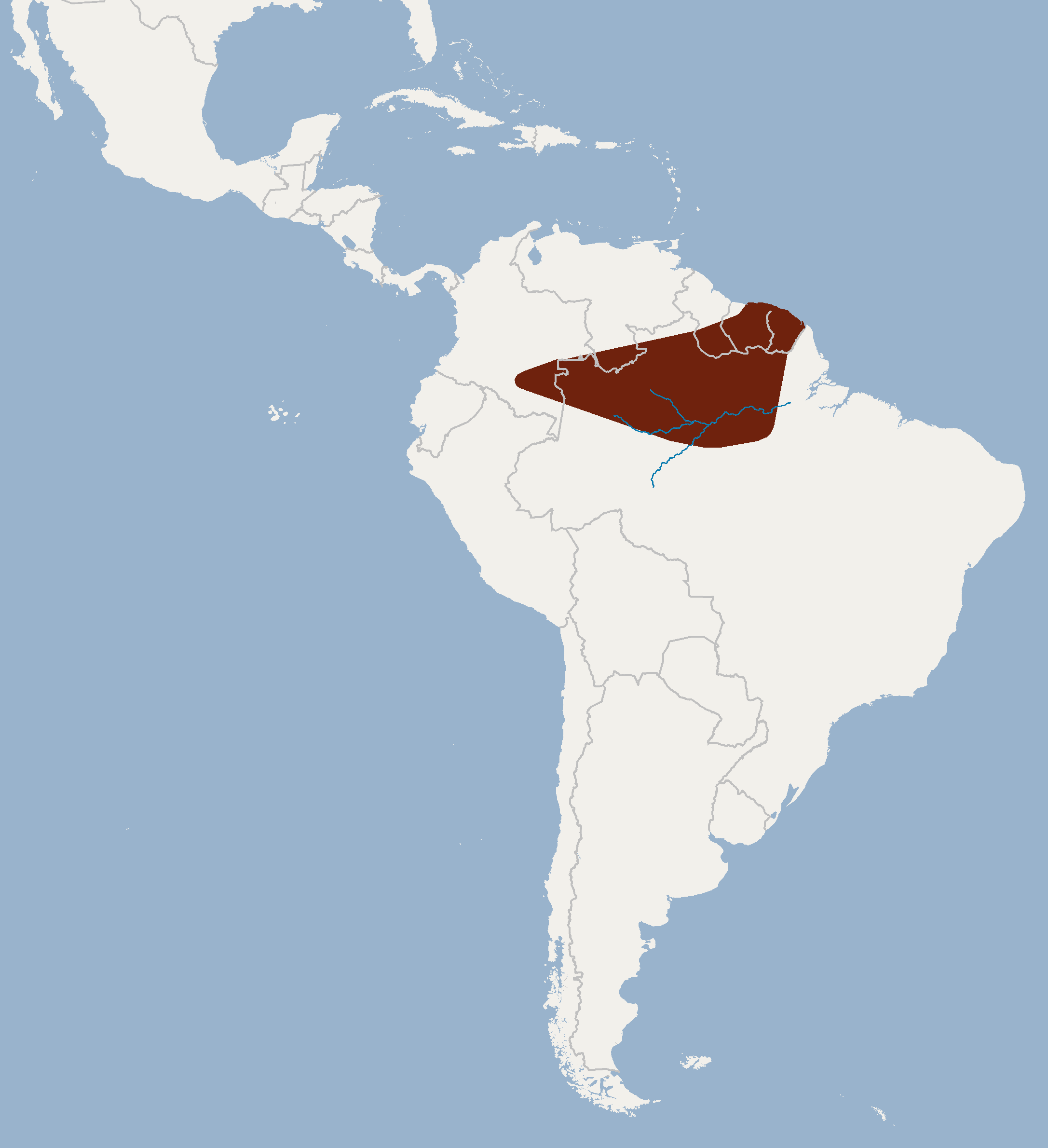

= Guianan spear-nosed bat =

Species of bat

The Guianan spear-nosed bat (Phyllostomus latifolius) is a bat species found in Brazil, Colombia, Guyana, Suriname and Venezuela.
