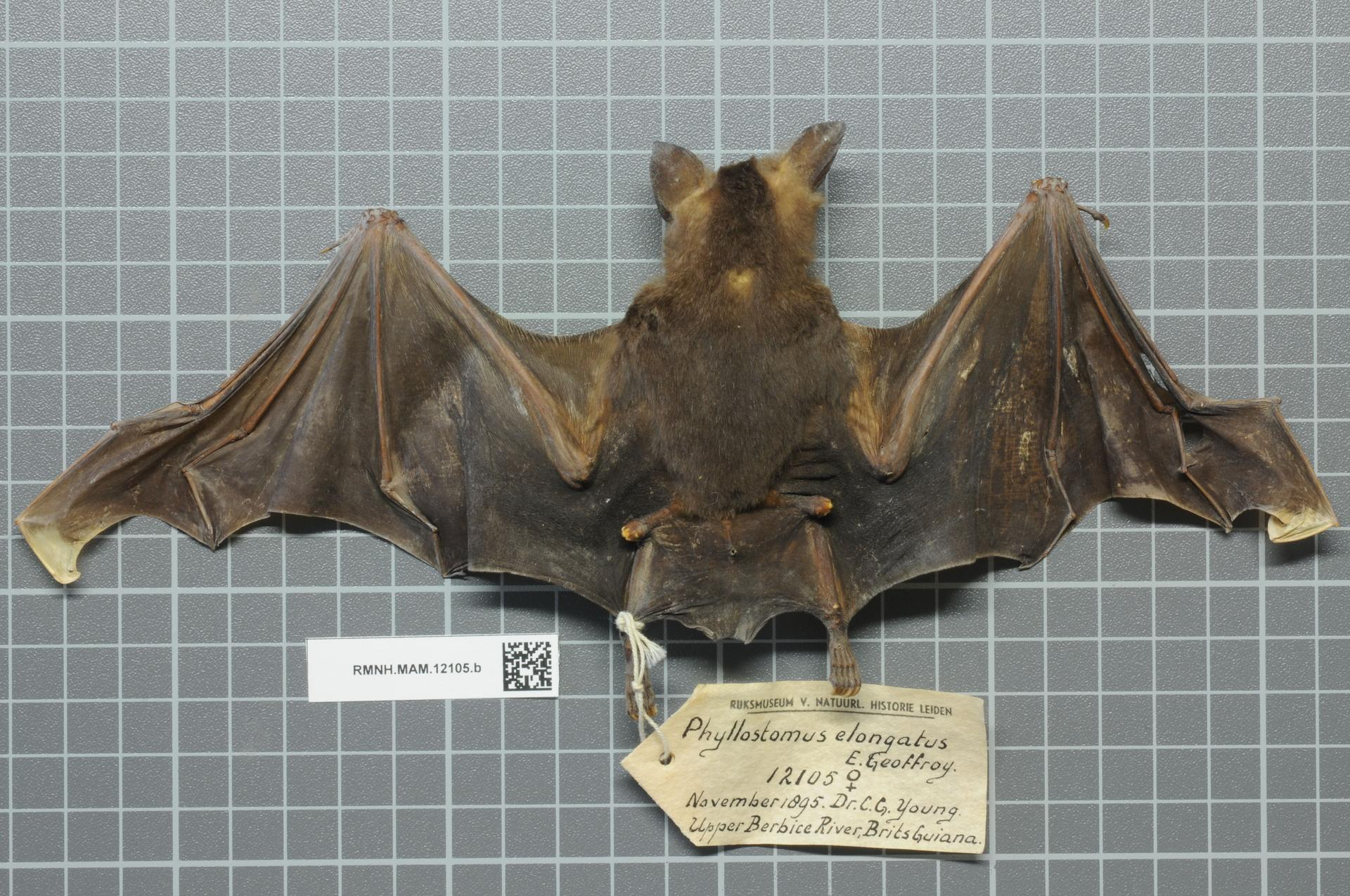

Conservation status
- Least Concern (IUCN 3.1)

Scientific classification
- Kingdom: Animalia
- Phylum: Chordata
- Class: Mammalia
- Order: Chiroptera
- Family: Phyllostomidae
- Genus: Phyllostomus
- Species: P. elongatus

Binomial name
- Phyllostomus elongatus Geoffroy, 1810
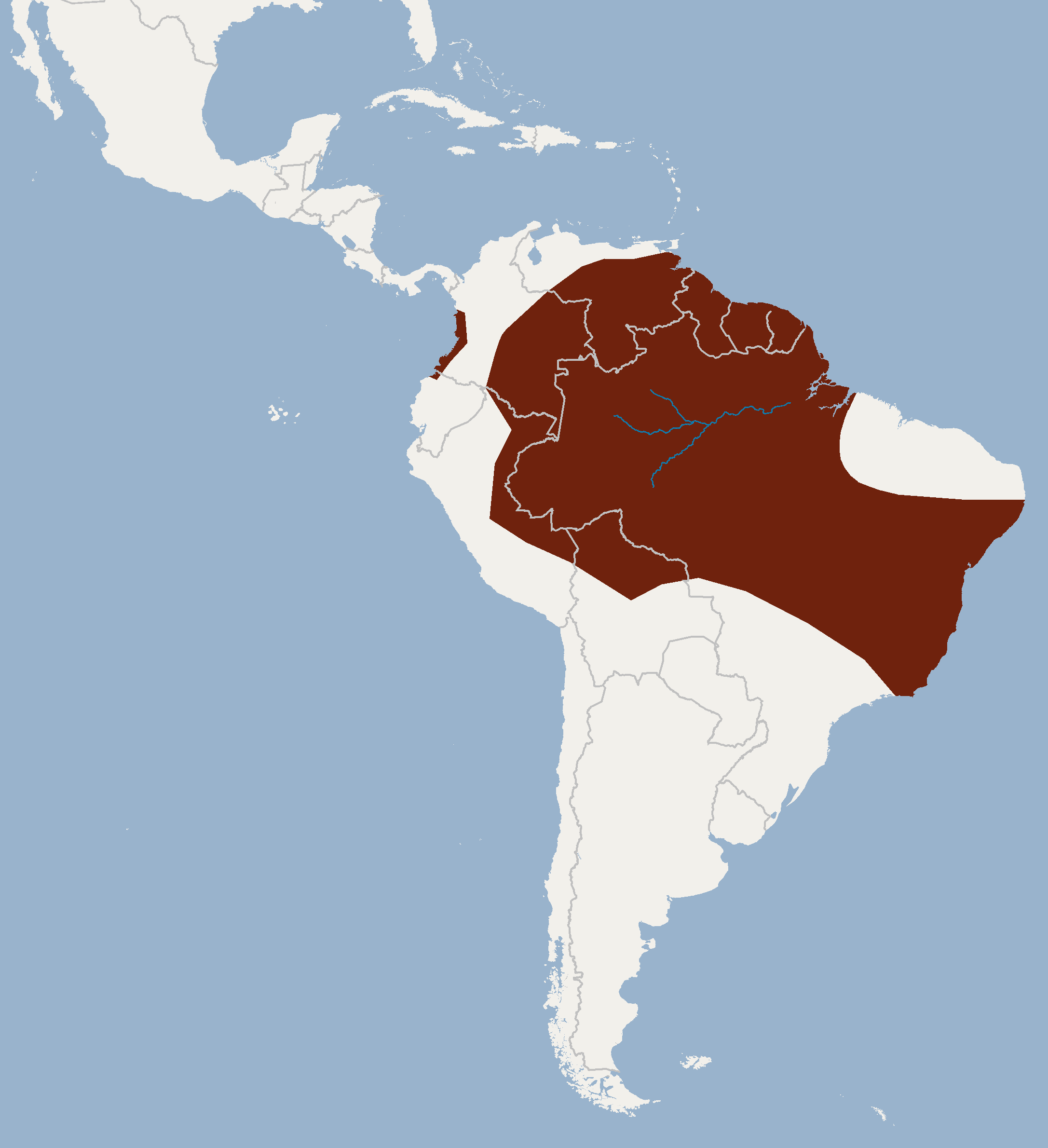

= Lesser spear-nosed bat =

Species of bat

The lesser spear-nosed bat (Phyllostomus elongatus) is a bat species found in Bolivia, Brazil, Colombia, Ecuador, Guyana, Peru, Suriname and Venezuela.
