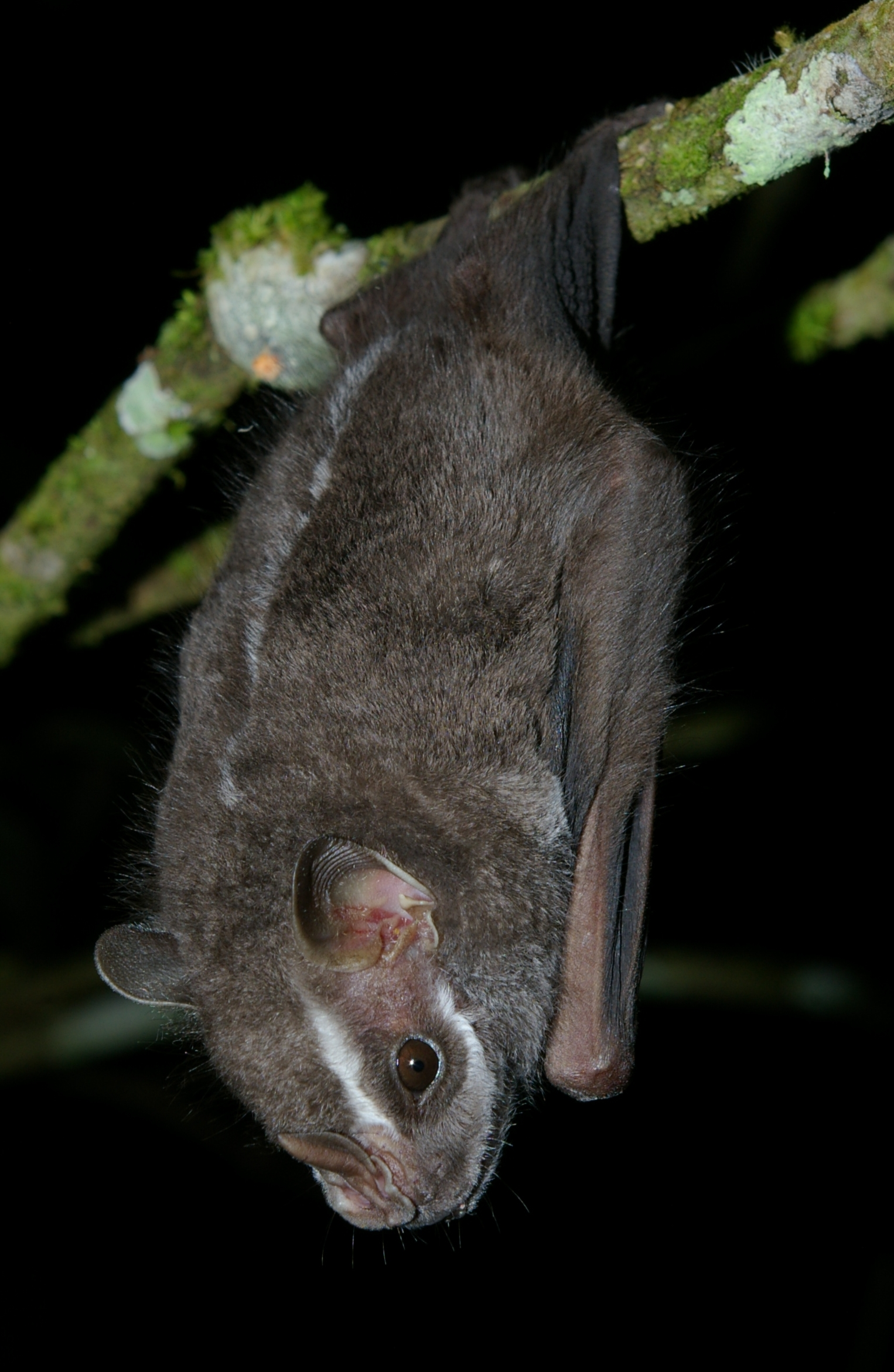

Conservation status
- Least Concern (IUCN 3.1)

Scientific classification
- Kingdom: Animalia
- Phylum: Chordata
- Class: Mammalia
- Order: Chiroptera
- Family: Phyllostomidae
- Genus: Chiroderma
- Species: C. salvini

Binomial name
- Chiroderma salvini Dobson, 1878
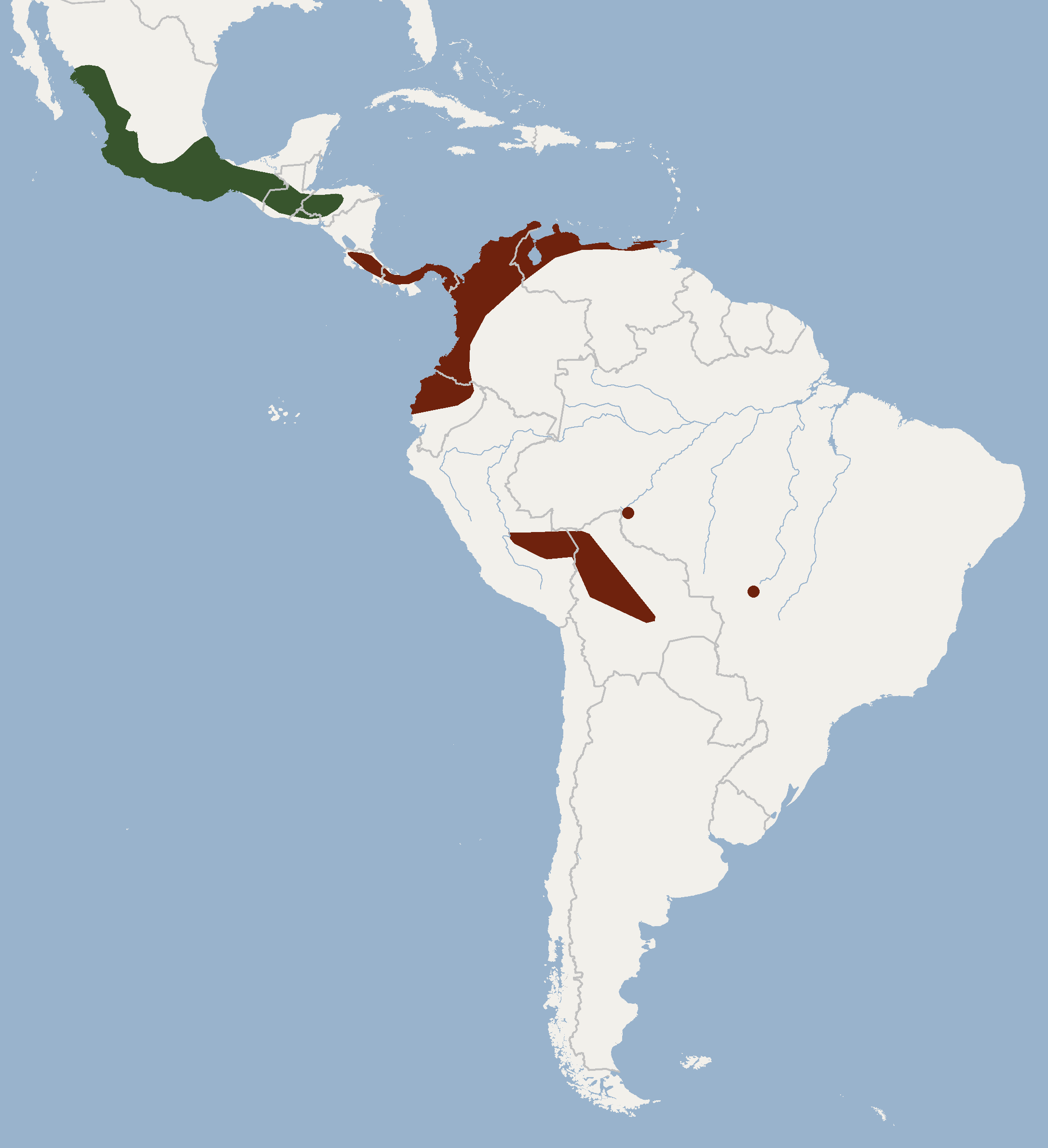

= Salvin's big-eyed bat =

Species of bat

Salvin's big-eyed bat (Chiroderma salvini) is a species of bat in the family Phyllostomidae. It is found in Bolivia, Colombia, Costa Rica, Ecuador, El Salvador, Guatemala, Honduras, Mexico, Panama, Peru, and Venezuela.
