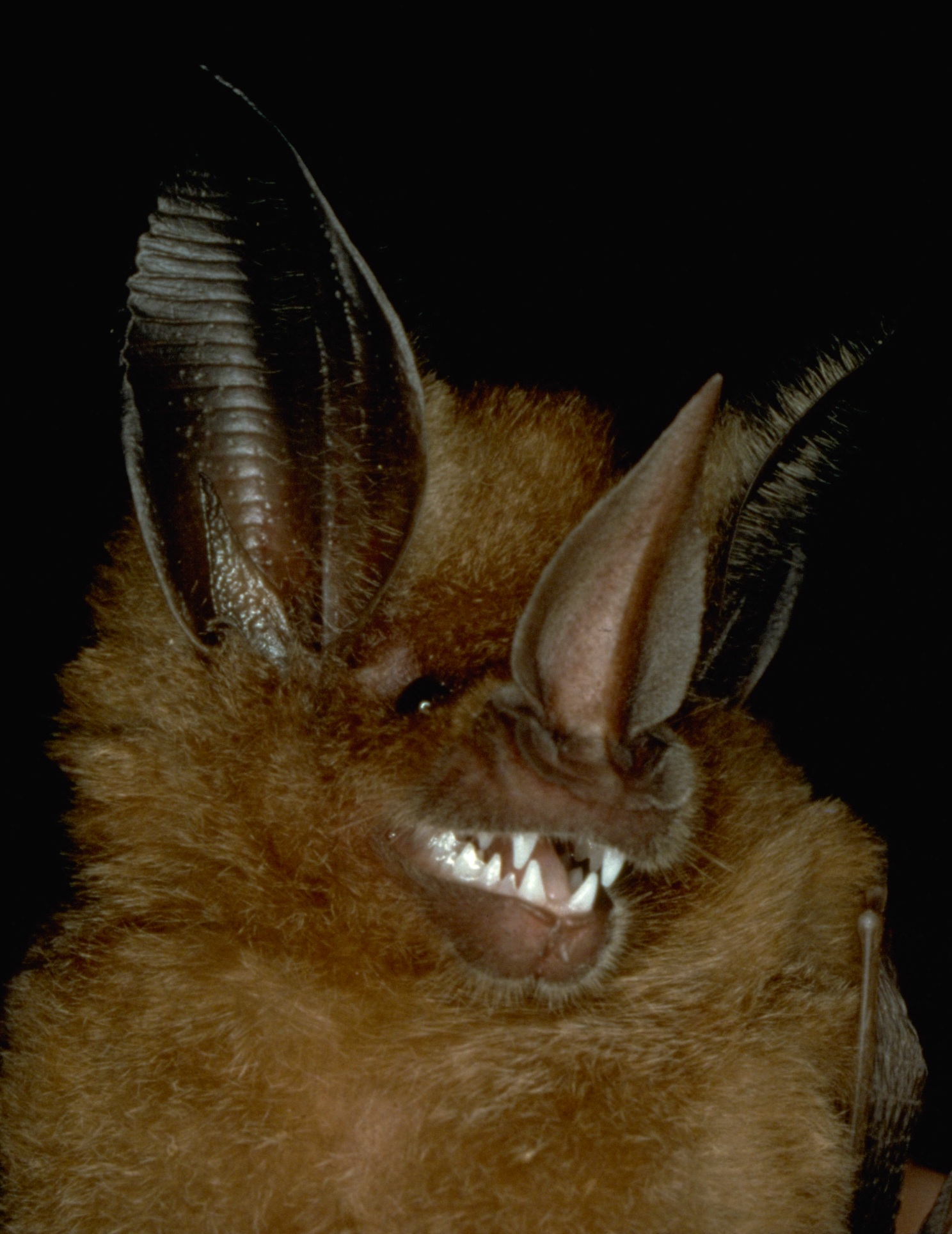
- Golden bat (Mimon bennettii)

Scientific classification
- Domain: Eukaryota
- Kingdom: Animalia
- Phylum: Chordata
- Class: Mammalia
- Order: Chiroptera
- Family: Phyllostomidae
- Subfamily: Phyllostominae
- Genus: Mimon; Gray, 1847

Type species
- Phyllostoma bennetti Gray, 1838

Species
- Mimon bennettii; Mimon cozumelae; Mimon crenulatum; Mimon koepckeae

= Mimon =

Genus of bats

Mimon is a bat genus from South America.

== Species ==
Genus: Mimon - Gray's spear-nosed bats

- Golden bat, Mimon bennettii
- Cozumelan golden bat, Mimon cozumelae
- Striped hairy-nosed bat, Mimon crenulatum
- Koepcke's hairy-nosed bat, Mimon koepckeae
