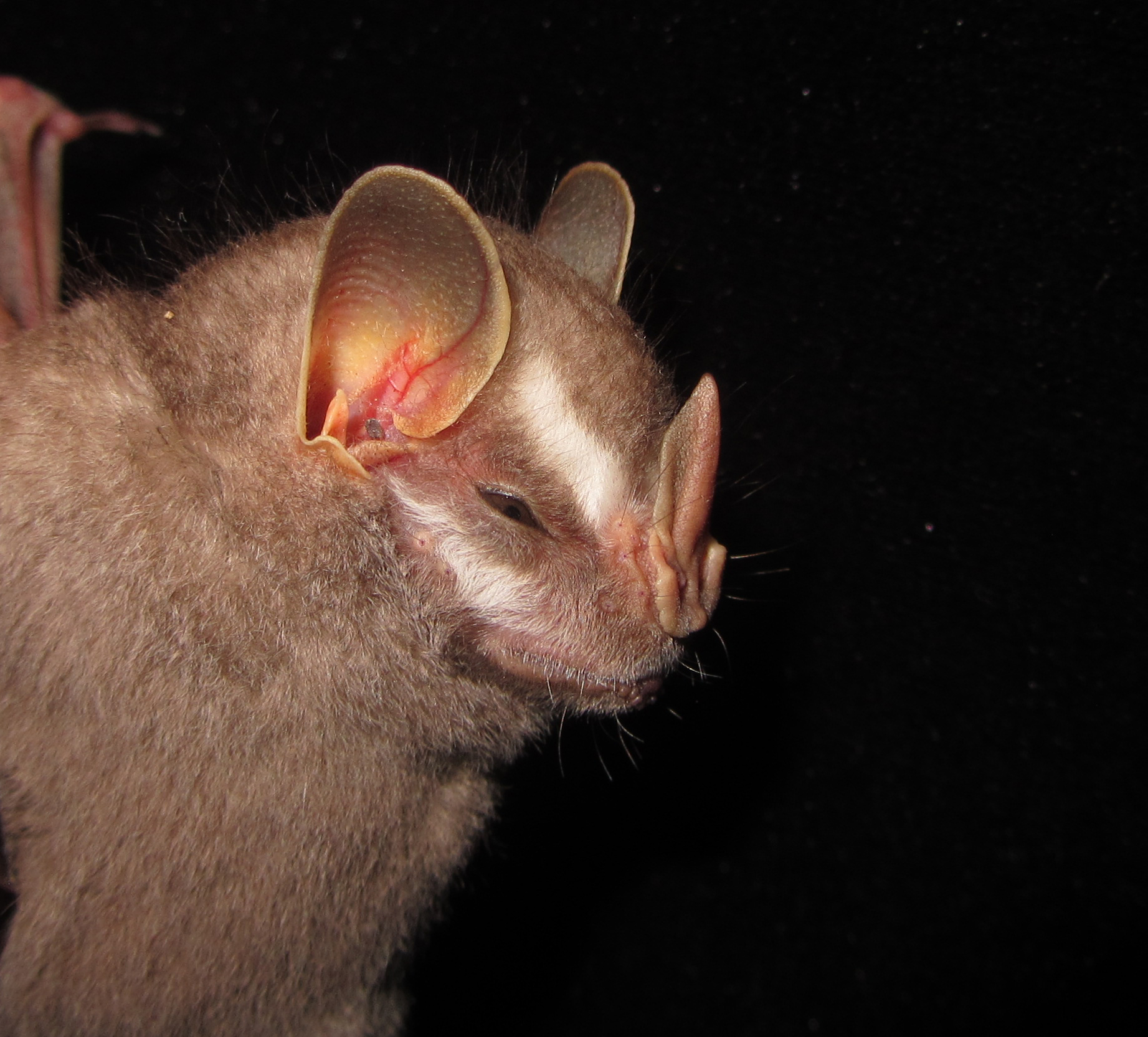

Conservation status
- Least Concern (IUCN 3.1)]

Scientific classification
- Kingdom: Animalia
- Phylum: Chordata
- Class: Mammalia
- Order: Chiroptera
- Family: Phyllostomidae
- Genus: Chiroderma
- Species: C. trinitatum

Binomial name
- Chiroderma trinitatum Goodwin, 1958

= Little big-eyed bat =

Species of bat

The little big-eyed bat (Chiroderma trinitatum) is a bat species from South and Central America.
