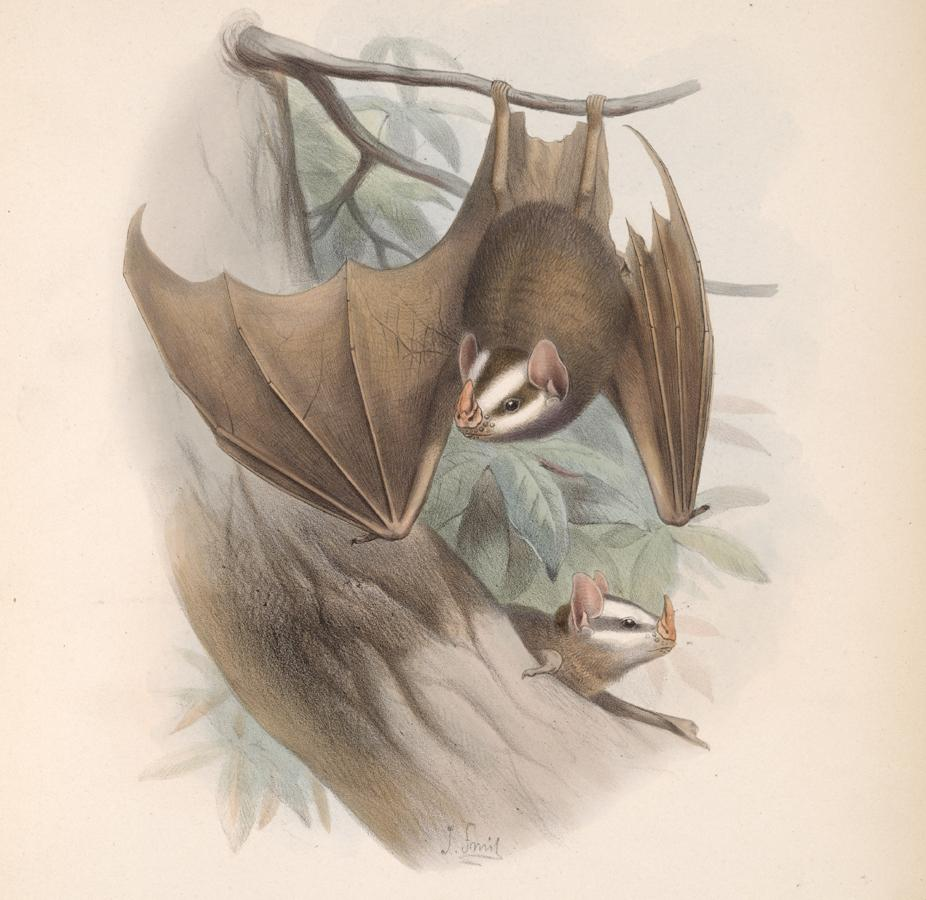
- Salvin's big-eyed bat (Chiroderma salvini)

Scientific classification
- Domain: Eukaryota
- Kingdom: Animalia
- Phylum: Chordata
- Class: Mammalia
- Order: Chiroptera
- Family: Phyllostomidae
- Subfamily: Stenodermatinae
- Genus: Chiroderma; Peters, 1860

Type species
- Chiroderma villosum Peters, 1860

Species
- Chiroderma doriae Chiroderma gorgasi Chiroderma improvisum Chiroderma salvini Chiroderma scopaeum Chiroderma trinitatum Chiroderma villosum Chiroderma vizottoi

Synonyms
- Mimetops Gray, 1866

= Chiroderma =

Genus of bats

Chiroderma – big-eyed bats or white-lined bats – is a genus of leaf-nosed bat found in North America, Central America, and South America and the Lesser Antilles.

== Species ==
The following species were recognized as of 2005, and a total of seven species to 2020

- Brazilian big-eyed bat, Chiroderma doriae Thomas, 1891
- Gorgas's big-eyed bat, Chiroderma gorgasi Handley, 1960
- Guadeloupe big-eyed bat, Chiroderma improvisum Baker & Genoways, 1976
- Salvin's big-eyed bat, Chiroderma salvini Dobson, 1878
- Mexican big-eyed bat, Chiroderma scopaeum Handley, 1966
- Little big-eyed bat, Chiroderma trinitatum Goodwin, 1958
- Hairy big-eyed bat, Chiroderma villosum Peters, 1860
- Vizotto's big-eyed bat Chiroderma vizottoi, Taddei & Lim, 2010
