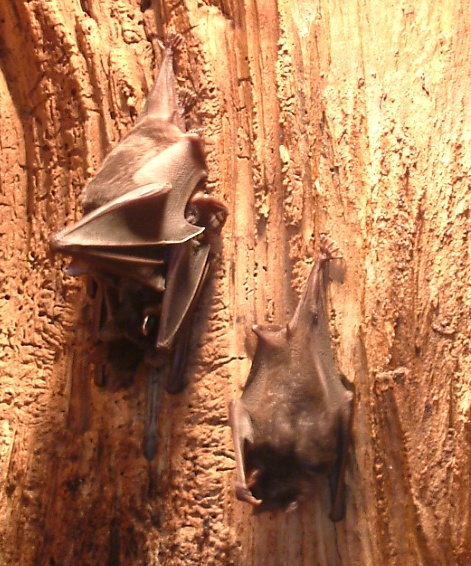
- Pale spear-nosed bat (Phyllostomus discolor)

Scientific classification
- Kingdom: Animalia
- Phylum: Chordata
- Class: Mammalia
- Order: Chiroptera
- Family: Phyllostomidae
- Subfamily: Phyllostominae
- Genus: Phyllostomus; Lacépède, 1799

Type species
- Vespertilio hastatus Pallas, 1767

Species
- P. discolor P. elongatus P. hastatus P latifolius

= Phyllostomus =

Genus of bats

Phyllostomus is a genus of leaf-nosed bat. It contains four described species.

== Species ==
Genus Phyllostomus - spear-nosed bats

- Pale spear-nosed bat, Phyllostomus discolor
- Lesser spear-nosed bat, Phyllostomus elongatus
- Greater spear-nosed bat, Phyllostomus hastatus
- Guianan spear-nosed bat, Phyllostomus latifolius
