= Valdir Antonio Taddei =

Brazilian professor of mammalogy (1942-2004)

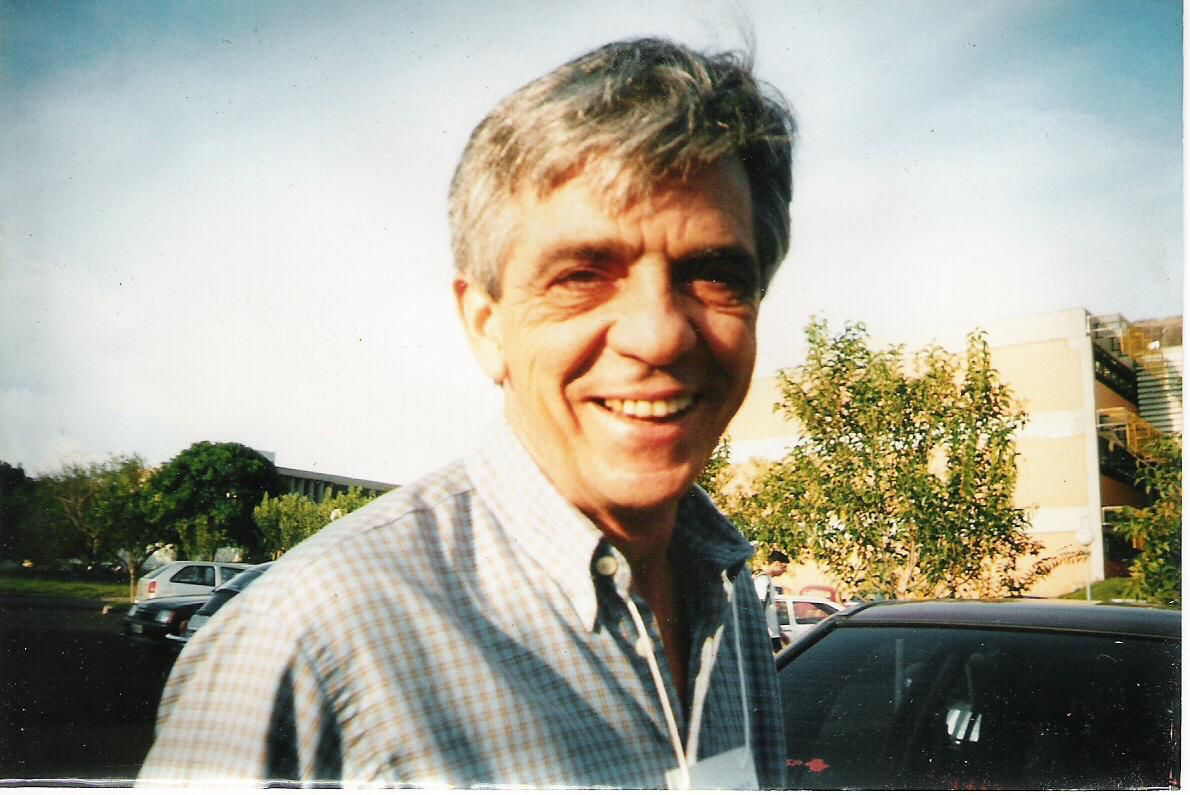
- Born: December 31, 1941; Urupês, São Paulo, Brazil
- Died: August 7, 2004 (aged 62); São José do Rio Preto, São Paulo, Brazil
- Education: Paulista State University Júlio de Mesquita Filho
- Occupation: Zoologist

Valdir Antonio Taddei (1942–2004) was a Brazilian zoologist and professor of mammalogy, known for his expertise in bats and works on chiropteran phylogenetics and mammalian systematics. He had a PhD in Biological Sciences (Zoology) and a Graduation in Natural History from the Paulista State University Júlio de Mesquita Filho, where he taught until retiring.

== Species described by Valdir Antonio Taddei ==
- Chiroderma vizottoi
- Dekeyser's nectar bat
- Bokermann's nectar bat

== Honors and awards ==
- Eptesicus taddeii, a species of bat, was named after Valdir to honor his contribution to the study of bats.
