= Koepcke's hairy-nosed bat =

Conservation status
- Data Deficient (IUCN 3.1)

Scientific classification
- Kingdom: Animalia
- Phylum: Chordata
- Class: Mammalia
- Order: Chiroptera
- Family: Phyllostomidae
- Genus: Gardnerycteris
- Species: G. koepckeae

Binomial name
- Gardnerycteris koepckeae Gardner & Patton, 1972
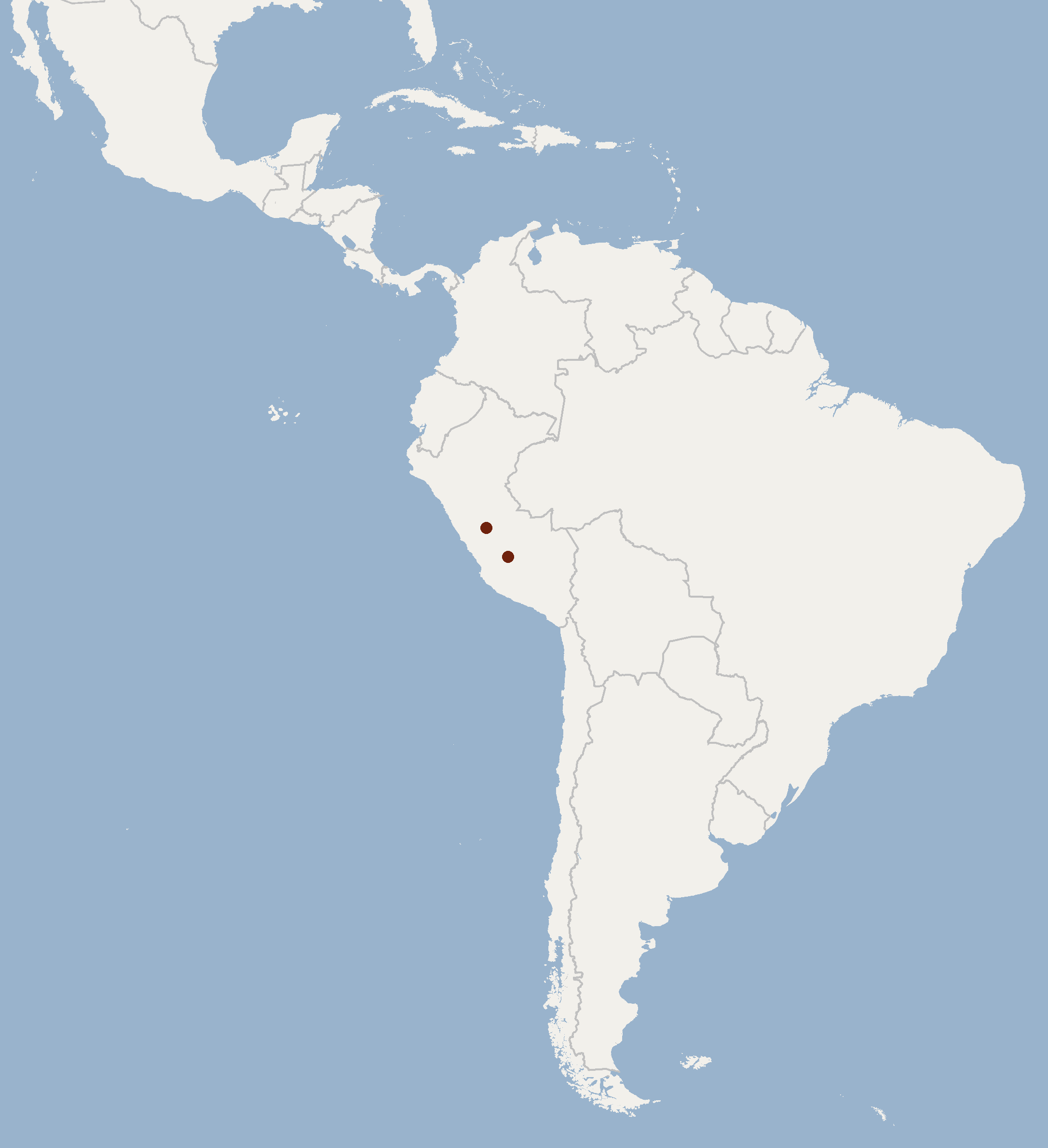

Species of bat

Koepcke's hairy-nosed bat (Gardnerycteris koepckeae) is a species of bat that is endemic to Peru.
