= Tijuca National Park =

National park in Brazil

- Parque Nacional da Tijuca
- IUCN category II (national park)
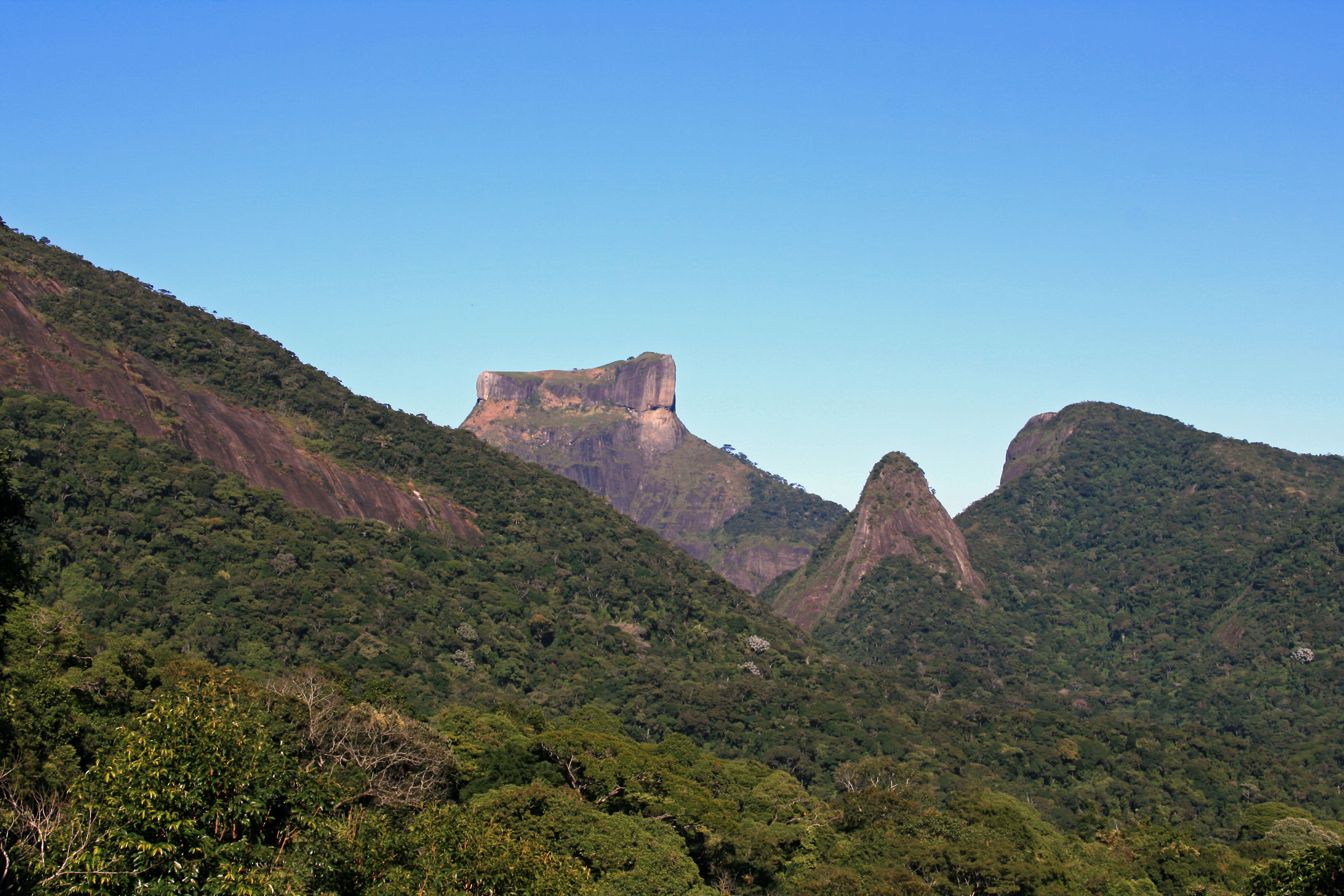
- View of Pedra da Gávea

- Location within Brazil
- Nearest city: Rio de Janeiro, State of Rio de Janeiro
- Coordinates: 22°57′34″S 43°16′40″W
- Area: 3,958.41 ha (9,781.4 acres)
- Designation: National park
- Created: 1961
- Visitors: 3,305,010 (in 2016)
- Administrator: ICMBio

UNESCO World Heritage Site
- Criteria: Natural: v, vi
- Reference: 1100
- Inscription: 2012 (36th Session)

The Tijuca National Park (Portuguese: Parque Nacional da Tijuca) is an urban national park in the mountains of the city of Rio de Janeiro, Brazil. The park is part of the Atlantic Forest Biosphere Preserve, and is administered by the Chico Mendes Institute for Biodiversity Conservation (ICMBio).

The area is composed of secondary vegetation, as it is the result of reforestation carried out during the Second Empire, when it became clear that deforestation caused by coffee farms was harming the drinking water supply of the then-capital of the Empire. More than 230 species of animals and birds live in the park, including capuchin monkeys, coatis, agoutis, wild dogs, marmosets, hummingbirds and thrushes.

== History ==
The contemporary Tijuca National Park and its surrounding forests are largely the result of reforestation. In the 1700s, forests in the future park around Rio de Janeiro were cleared for fuel, coffee growing, and livestock. The small streams in the former forest were a significant source of the city's water supply, and, with variable rainfall, the city began to experience water shortages and flash floods.

Early conservation efforts began in 1817, when King Dom João VI issued a decree prohibiting the cutting of trees surrounding the springs of the Carioca River to protect the city's water supply. This was followed by experimental plantings between 1846 and 1847 on the outskirts of Corcovado Mountain, where approximately 3,000 seedlings were planted in what would become the Paineiras Forest.

Emperor Pedro II of Brazil established federal control over the area in 1861, and efforts began to restore the former forest on the bare slopes and abandoned fields. The re-planting of trees was carried out by 6 enslaved persons. Their names were Eleutério, Constantino, Manuel, Mateus, Leopoldo, and Maria. These people were enslaved by the Portuguese government and under the supervision of the Tijuca Forest manager Major Manuel Gomes Archer.

From 1861 to 1887, they planted over 100,000 trees. The project utilized seedbeds and nurseries to cultivate seedlings, including those transplanted from the neighboring Pedra Branca Massif. Although some exotic species were used, the project prioritized native Brazilian flora, specifically hardwoods such as canjerana, garapiapunha, and sapucaia. In the 1880s, this forest policy was expanded with the creation of the Andaraí Grande and Jacarepaguá Forests.

Around this time, a cog railway was built to carry passengers to the top of Corcovado, and between 1922 and 1931 the famous statue Christ the Redeemer was built.

In 1961, Tijuca Forest was declared a national park, and in 2011, the Carioca Mosaic was established, including the park. In 2012, UNESCO designated the landscapes around Rio de Janeiro, including the park, as a World Heritage Site.

== Geography ==
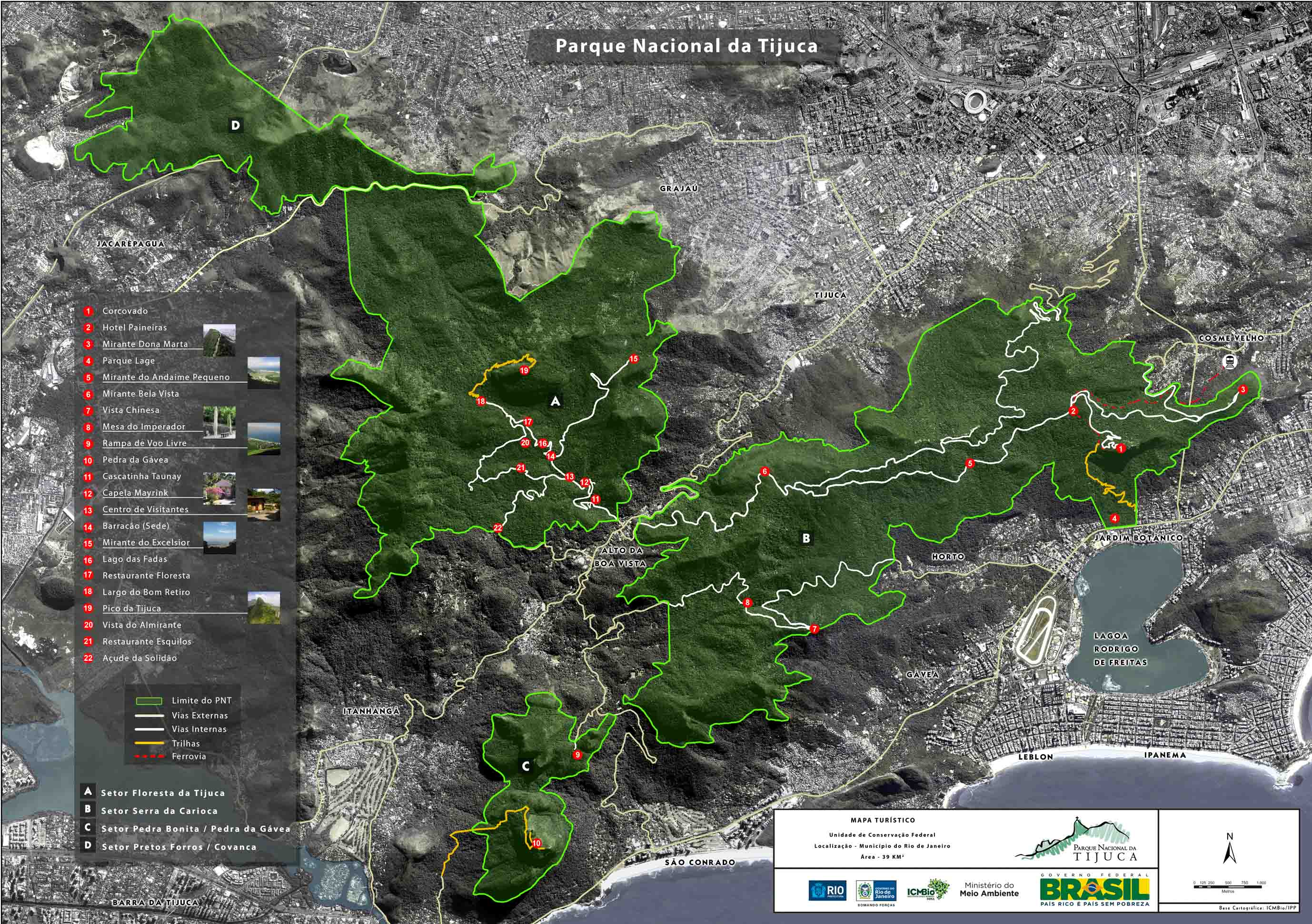
The park boundaries as of 2011.

Tijuca National Park is claimed to be the world's largest urban forest, covering some 39.58 square kilometres (15.28 mi^{2}), although this title is disputed with Johannesburg, South Africa.

The park shares its name with the bairros (neighborhoods) of Tijuca and Barra da Tijuca nearby. The word Tijuca comes from the Tupi language and means marsh, a reference to the Tijuca Lagoon in the contemporary Barra da Tijuca.

It is located in a mountainous region which encompasses the Tijuca Massif. Among its impressive peaks are the Pedra da Gávea, Corcovado and Pico da Tijuca. The forest and mountains form a natural boundary that separates the West Zone of Rio from the rest of the city, as well as dividing the North and South Zones.

One favela exists in the Tijuca Forest, called Mata Machado. Its inhabitants are mainly the descendants of those who migrated to the region in the 1930s to take part in the replanting effort. Though conditions have improved recently under the Favela-Bairro Project, it still contributes to environmental degradation in the forest.

Ecology

The Forest is home to hundreds of species of plants and wildlife, many threatened by extinction, and found only in the Atlantic Forest biome. The Critically Endangered tree species Annona ferruginea is endemic to the park. The vegetation is so dense that scientists have estimated that ambient temperatures in surrounding areas have been lowered by up to 9 °C. The forest also contains some 30 waterfalls.

Due to the reforestation efforts of the late 19th century, about half of the area of a park is a mix of about 30 native tree species and ten introduced species. It is currently threatened by frequent, accidental fires set by humans, a problem compounded by colonization by more flammable grasses displacing native vegetation.

== Tourism ==
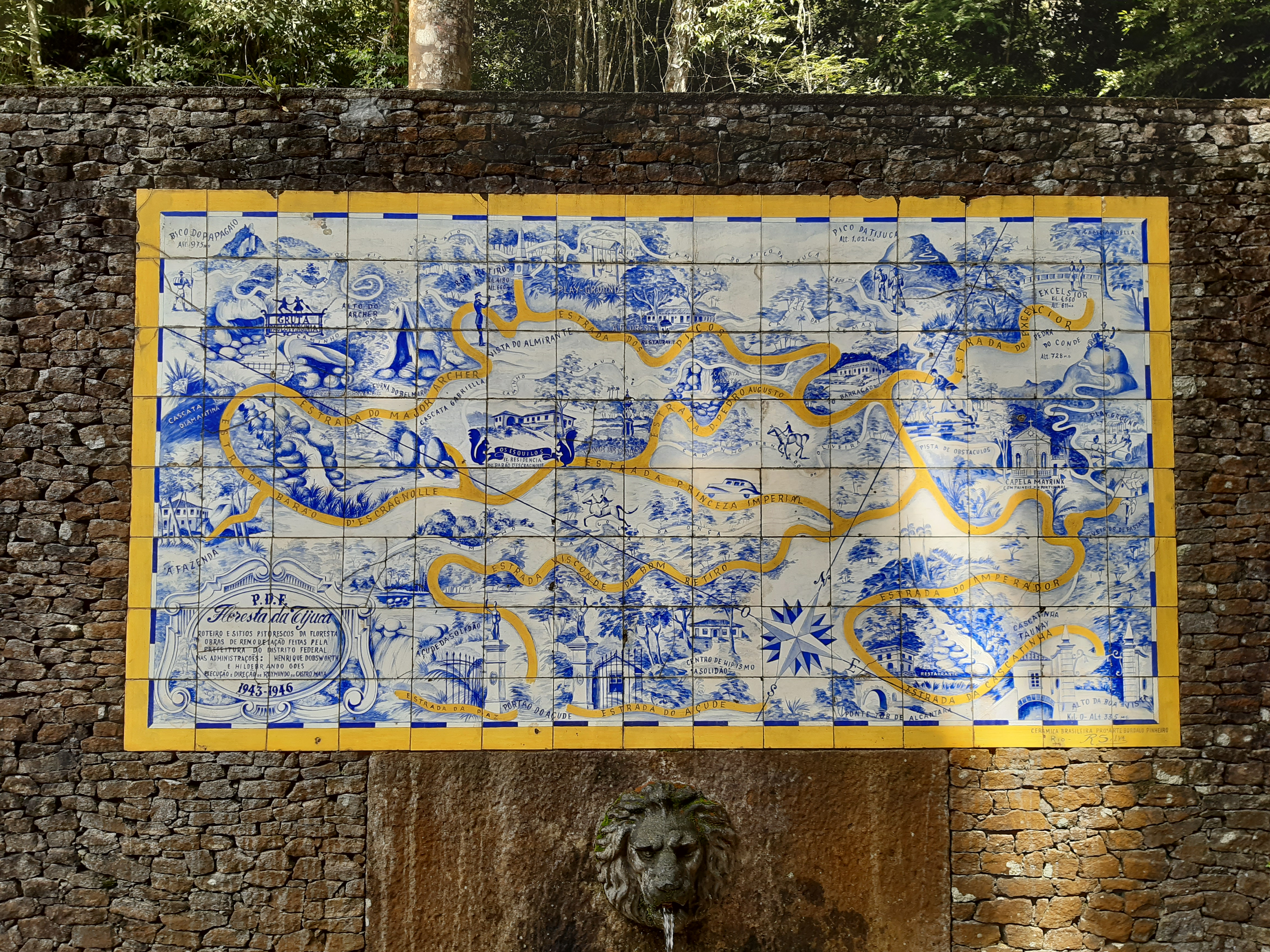
A map of the Floresta da Tijuca portion of the park in azulejos

Given its proximity to the city, the park receives heavy use: in 2016, the park received 3,305,010 visitors. The park contains a number of attractions, most famously the colossal sculpture of Christ the Redeemer. Other attractions include the Cascatinha Waterfall; the Mayrink Chapel, with murals painted by Cândido Portinari; the pagoda-style gazebo at Vista Chinesa; and a giant granite table called the Mesa do Imperador ("Emperor's Table").

There are numerous hiking trails. Common destinations are: Diamantina's waterfall, Parrot's Beak (Bico do Papagaio), Tijuca's Peak (Pico da Tijuca), Cave Circuit (Circuito das Grutas), Archer's Hill (Morro do Archer), Anhanguera's Hill (Morro da Anhanguera), the Excelsior Lookout (Mirante do Excelsior) and the Bat's Cave (Caverna dos Morcegos).

== See also ==
- List of mammals of Tijuca National Park

== Sources ==
- Mosaico Carioca de Áreas Protegidas (in Portuguese), MMA, archived from the original on 17 June 2024
