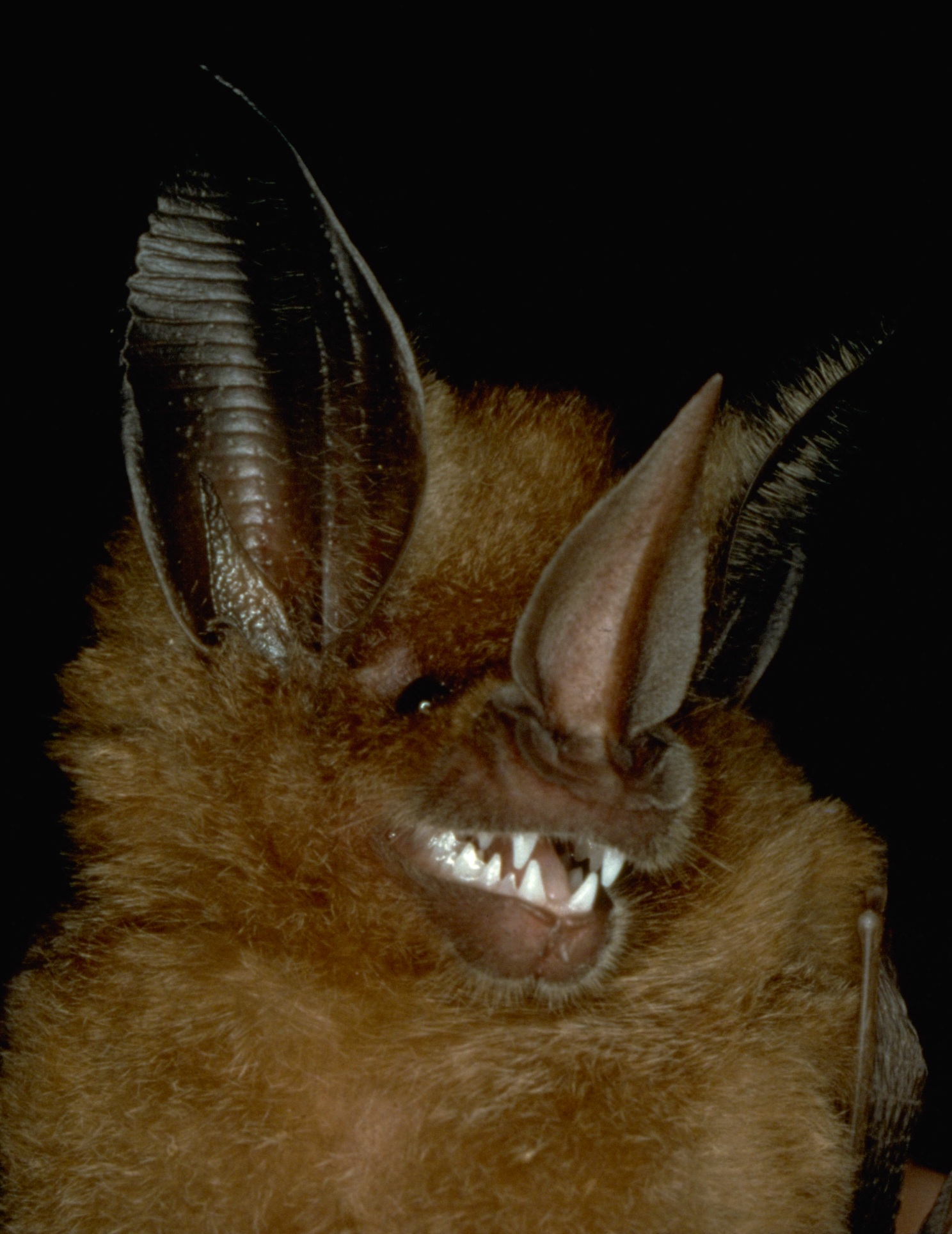

Conservation status
- Least Concern (IUCN 3.1)

Scientific classification
- Kingdom: Animalia
- Phylum: Chordata
- Class: Mammalia
- Order: Chiroptera
- Family: Phyllostomidae
- Genus: Mimon
- Species: M. bennettii

Binomial name
- Mimon bennettii Gray, 1838
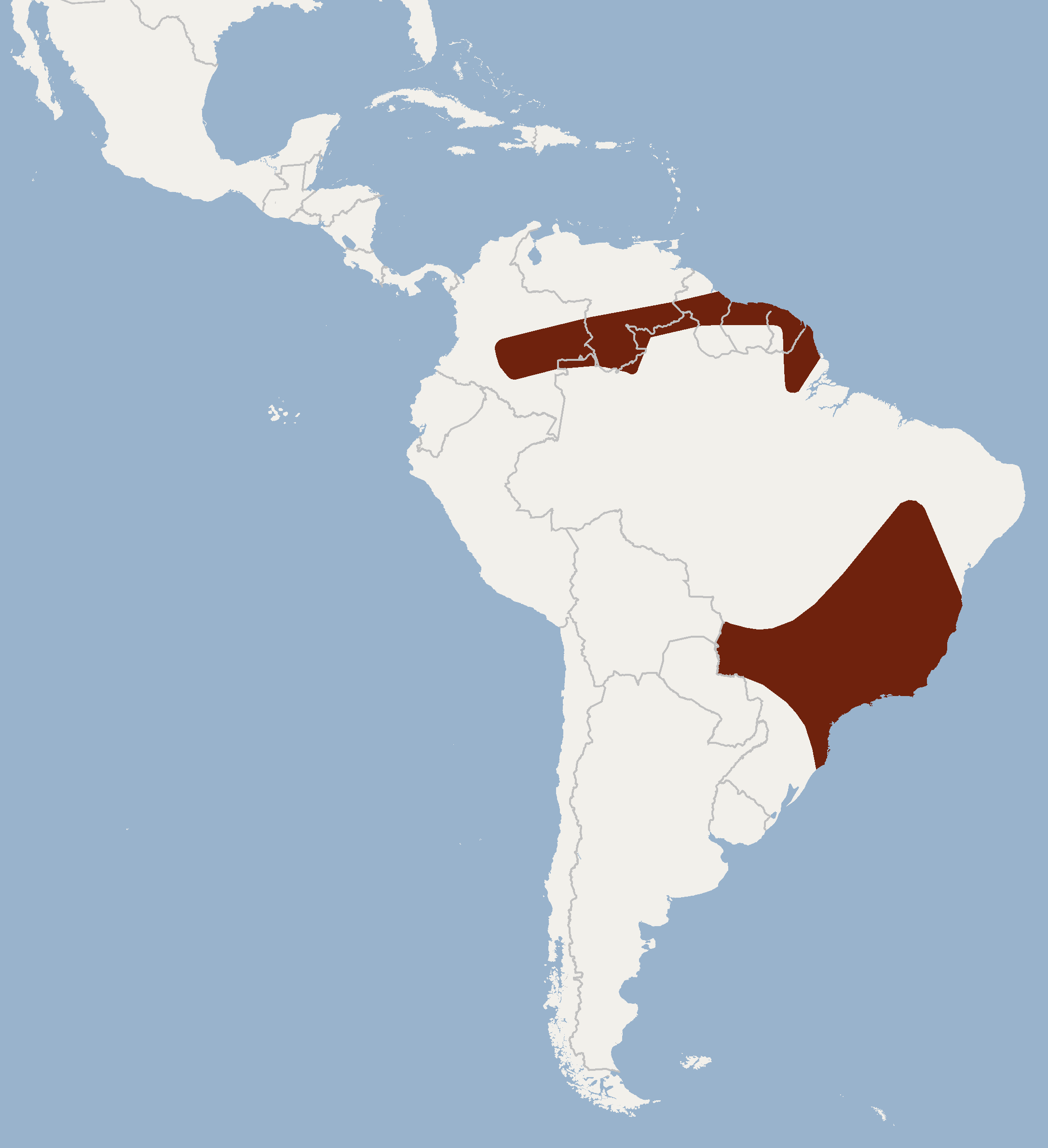

= Golden bat =

Species of bat

The golden bat (Mimon bennettii) is a bat species found in Brazil, Colombia, French Guiana, Guyana, Suriname and Venezuela.
