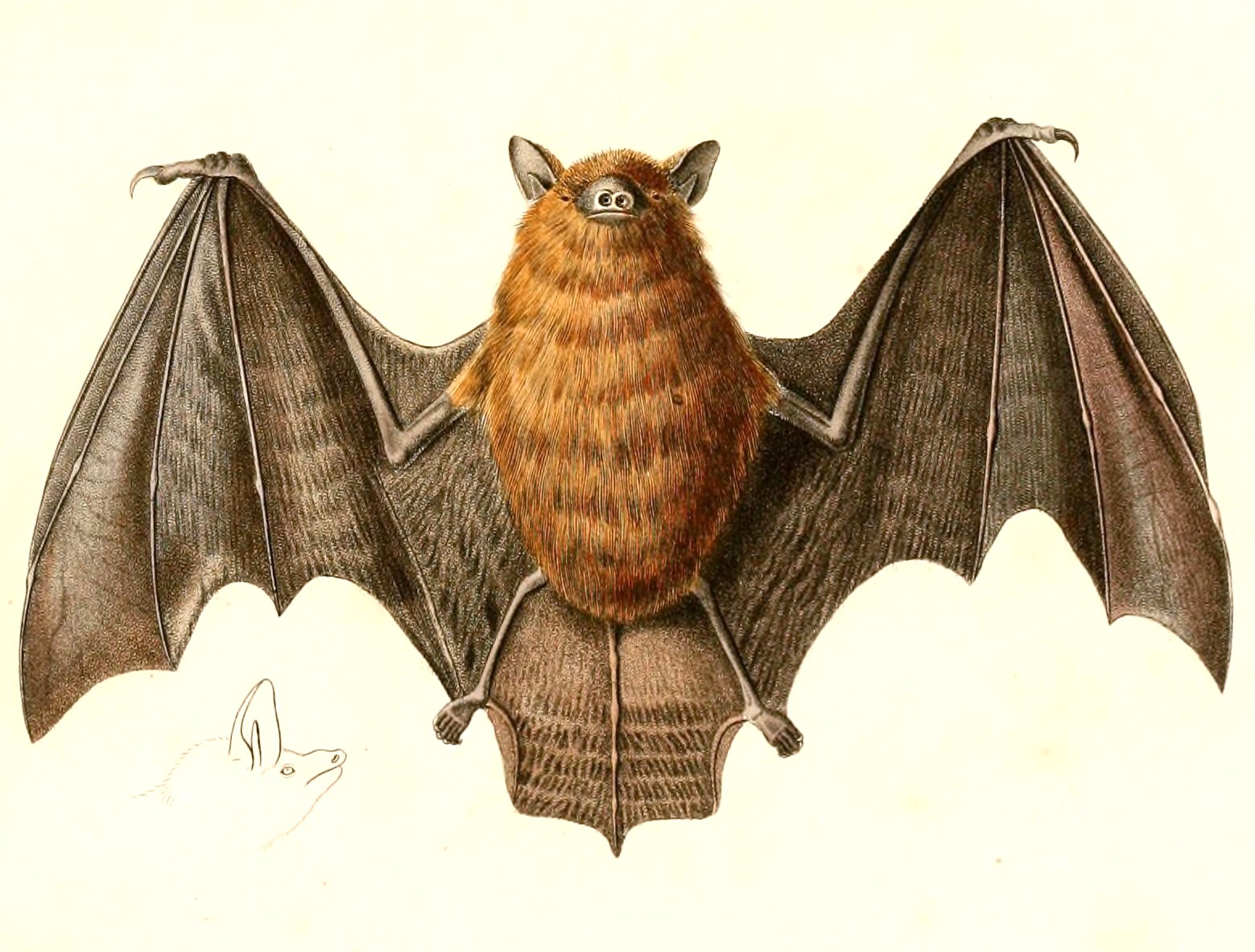

Conservation status
- Near Threatened (IUCN 3.1)

Scientific classification
- Kingdom: Animalia
- Phylum: Chordata
- Class: Mammalia
- Order: Chiroptera
- Family: Vespertilionidae
- Genus: Myotis
- Species: M. ruber

Binomial name
- Myotis ruber É. Geoffroy, 1806
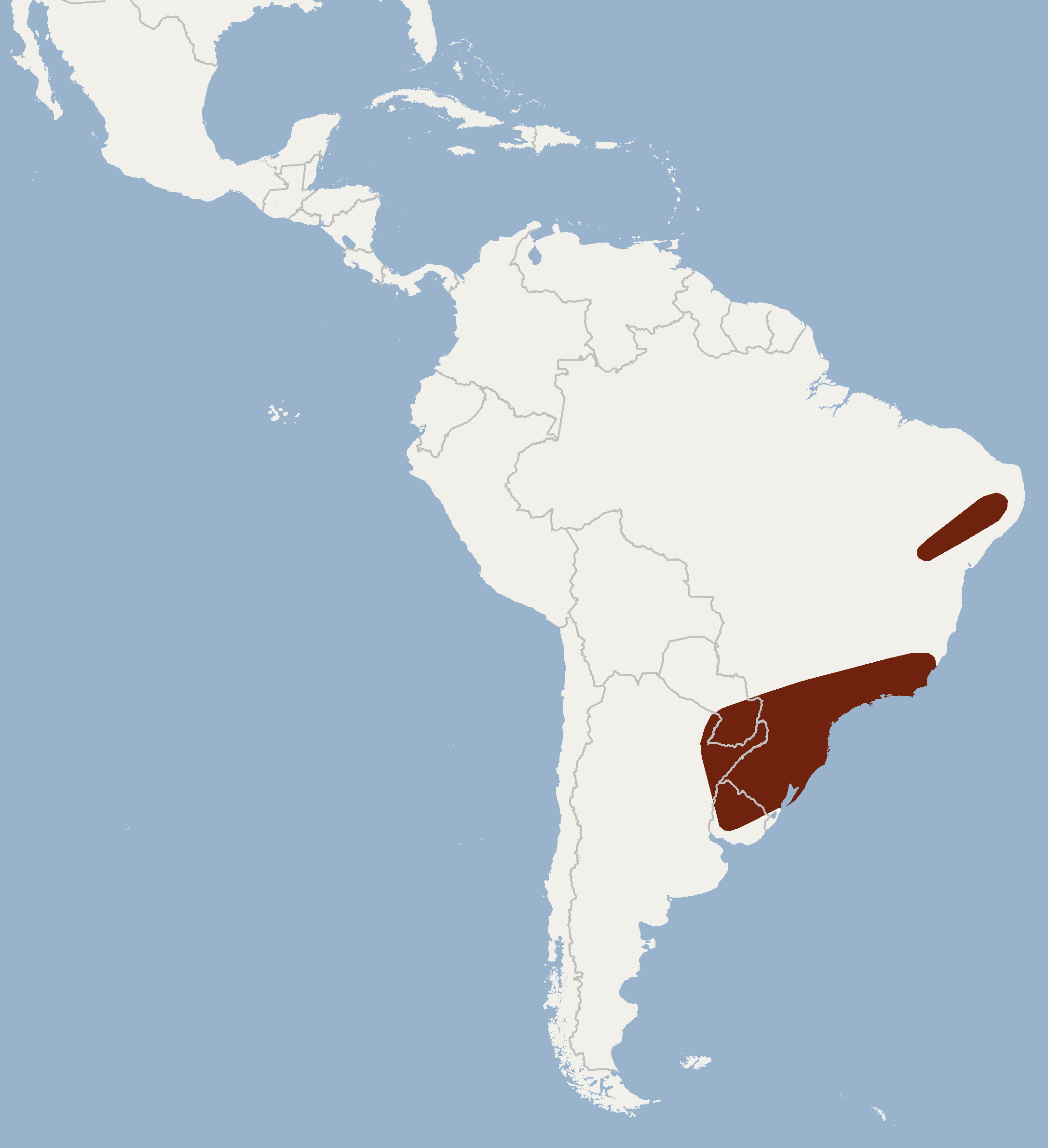

= Red myotis =

Species of bat

The red myotis (Myotis ruber) is a vesper bat species found in Argentina, Brazil, Paraguay and Uruguay.
