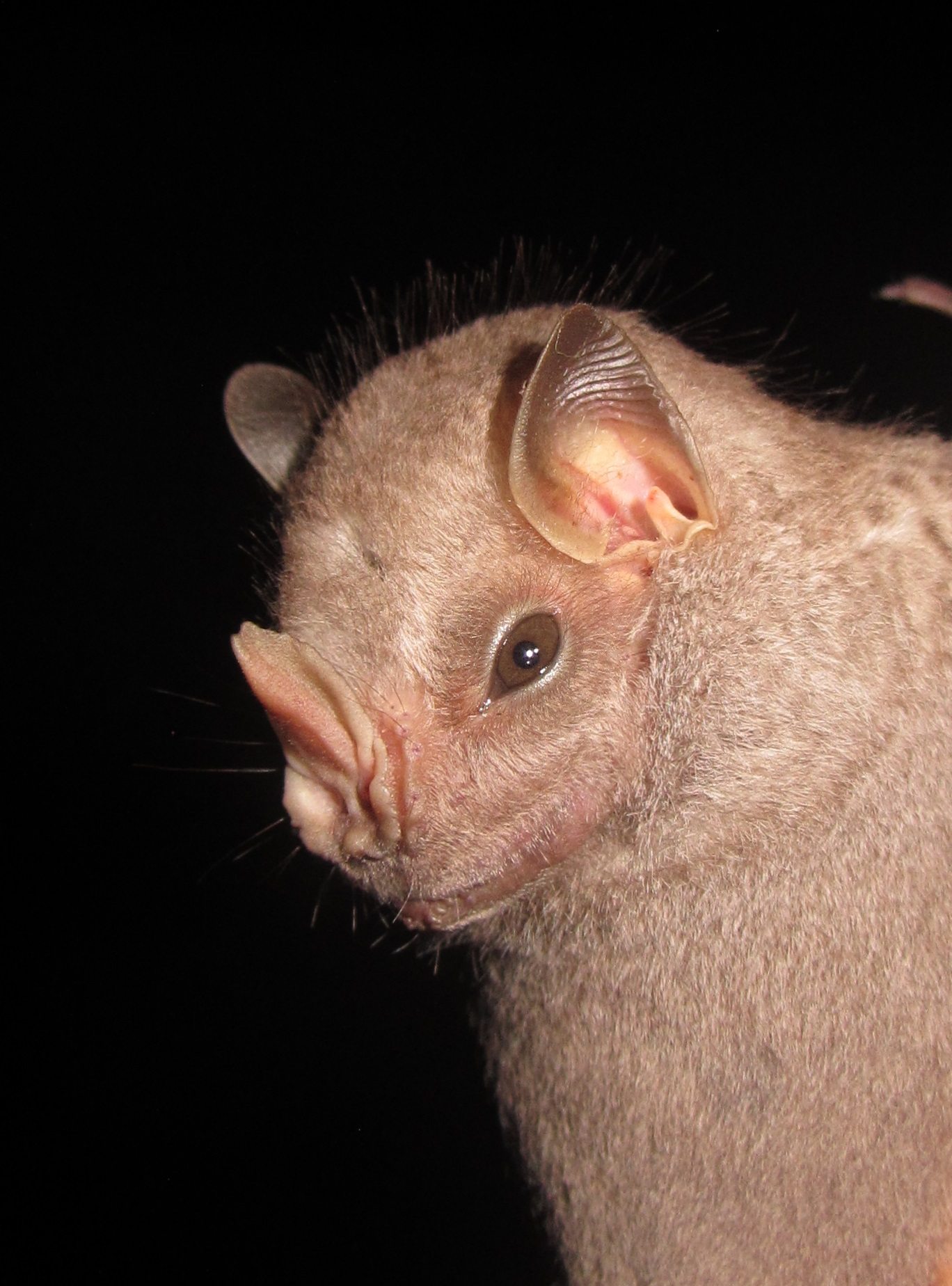

Conservation status
- Least Concern (IUCN 3.1)

Scientific classification
- Kingdom: Animalia
- Phylum: Chordata
- Class: Mammalia
- Order: Chiroptera
- Family: Phyllostomidae
- Genus: Chiroderma
- Species: C. villosum

Binomial name
- Chiroderma villosum Peters, 1860

= Hairy big-eyed bat =

Species of bat

The hairy big-eyed bat (Chiroderma villosum) is a bat species from South and Central America.
