= Chávez (surname) =

Chávez or Chavez is a Spanish language surname (derived from Latin Flaviae). with a Portuguese language variant (Chaves). Notable people with the name include:

- Aaliyah Chavez, American basketball player
- Alexis Sebastian Chavez (born 2002), Argentinian Paralympic athlete
- Agnes Chavez, American artist
- Angélico Chávez (1910–1996), American Franciscan priest, historian, author, poet, and painter
- Anthony Chavez (born 1970), American baseball player
- Armando Chávez (born 1955), Mexican rower
- Armando Neyra Chávez (born 1937), Mexican politician
- Betssy Chávez, Peruvian politician
- Carlos Chávez (football administrator) (1958–2018), Bolivian football administrator
- Carlos Chávez (1899–1978), Mexican composer, conductor, teacher, journalist
- César Chávez (1927–1993), American founder of the National Farm Workers Association, which became United Farm Workers
- Christian Chávez (born 1983), Mexican actor and singer, most famously known for RBD and for coming out about his homosexuality
- Coronado Chávez (1807–1881), President of Honduras
- Dennis Chavez (1888–1962), American politician
- Endy Chávez (born 1978), Venezuelan baseball player
- Eric Chavez (born 1977), American baseball player
- Federico Chávez (1882–1978), President of Paraguay, 1949–1954
- Fermín Chávez (1924–2006), Argentinian historian, poet and journalist
- Frank Chavez (Teamsters), Teamsters union official and close ally of Jimmy Hoffa
- Gerardo Chávez (1937–2025), Peruvian painter, sculptor and visual artist
- Gilbert Espinosa Chávez (1932–2020), American Roman Catholic bishop
- Gina Chavez (born 1982), American Latin folk singer and songwriter
- Hugo Chávez (1954–2013), President of Venezuela
- Ignacio Chávez (disambiguation), multiple people
- Jeanine Áñez Chávez (born 1967), interim president of Bolivia
- Jesse Chavez (born 1983), baseball player
- Jesús Chávez (born 1972), Mexican boxer
- Jordan Chavez (born 1997), American soccer player
- Jorge Chávez (1887–1910), Peruvian airplane pilot
- Jorge F. Chavez (born 1961), American jockey
- José Chávez y Chávez (1851–1924), American outlaw, member of the Lincoln County Regulators
- Julio César Chávez (born 1962), Mexican boxer
- Julio César Chávez Jr. (born 1986), Mexican boxer, son of Julio César
- Kharla Chávez (born 1975), Ecuadorian politician
- Laura Chavez (born 1982), American blues, soul, and rhythm and blues guitarist, songwriter and record producer
- Linda Chavez (born 1947), American author and commentator
- Linda Chavez-Thompson (born 1944), American trade unionist
- Leo Chavez (born 1951), American anthropologist
- Lori Chavez-DeRemer (born 1968), American politician and businesswoman
- Martha Chávez (born 1953), Peruvian politician
- Martin Chavez (born 1952), American politician from New Mexico
- Néstor Chávez (1947–1969), Venezuelan baseball player
- Nicholas Alexander Chavez (born 1999), American actor
- Omar Chávez (born 1990), Mexican boxer, son of Julio César
- R. Martin Chavez (born c. 1964), American banker
- Raúl Chávez (born 1973), Venezuelan baseball player
- Reydnier Chavez, Venezuelan ten-pin bowler
- Roberto Esteban Chavez (1932–2024), American artist
- Tito D. Chavez (born 1947), American politician

== Fictional characters ==
- Domingo Chavez, a fictional character in Tom Clancy's novels
- Maurice Chavez, a fictional character in "Grand Theft Auto: Vice City"
- America Chavez, a fictional character in the Marvel Universe
- Todd Chavez, a main character from BoJack Horseman
- Jose Chavez y Chavez, character from the movie "Young Guns"
