= Chaves =

Chaves is a modern Portuguese and old Spanish word derived from Latin Flaviae (Chávez in Spanish), and may refer to:

== People ==
- Andia Chaves Fonnegra, Colombian marine biologist
- Aureliano Chaves (1929–2003), Brazilian politician
- Avelino Chaves (1931–2021), Spanish footballer
- Bartolomeu Chaves (born 2001), Brazilian para-athlete
- Esteban Chaves (born 1990), Colombian cyclist
- Henrique Chaves (born 1997), Portuguese racing driver
- Ignacio Chaves Tellería (c. 1836–1925), president of Nicaragua
- Joara Chaves (born 1962), Brazilian chess player
- Juca Chaves (1938–2023), Brazilian comedian, singer and writer
- Jussara Chaves (born 1959), Brazilian chess player
- Louis Chaves (born 1943), American serial killer
- Manuel Chaves González (born 1945), Spanish politician
- Manuel Chaves Nogales (c. 1897–1945), Spanish journalist and writer.
- Manuel Antonio Chaves (c. 1818–1889), New Mexican soldier and United States Civil War hero
- Marcos Chaves (born 1961), Brazilian contemporary artist
- Maria Amélia Chaves (1911–2017), Portuguese civil engineer
- Michael Chaves (born 1984), American filmmaker
- Ñuflo de Chaves (1518–1568), Spanish conquistador
- Orlando Chaves (disambiguation), multiple people
- Pedro Chaves (born 1965), former Formula One driver and Portuguese Rally Champion
- Renato Chaves (born 1990), Brazilian professional footballer
- Rodrigo Chaves Robles (born 1961), president of Costa Rica
- Vaimalama Chaves (born 1994), French model and beauty pageant titleholder

== Places ==
- Chaves, Portugal, a city and municipality in the district of Vila Real
- Chaves, Pará, a municipality in Brazil
- Chaves County, New Mexico, a county in the United States

== Other ==
- El Chavo del Ocho, a Mexican television series known as Chaves in Brazil and Portugal
- G.D. Chaves, an association football club from Portugal

== See also ==
- Chávez (disambiguation)
- Chávez (surname)
