= Frank Chavez (disambiguation) =

Frank Chavez may refer to:

- Francisco "Frank" Chavez, Filipino lawyer and former Solicitor General
- Frank Chávez, Venezuelan footballer,
- Frank Chavez (Teamsters), Teamsters union official and close ally of Jimmy Hoffa
- Francisco Xavier Chaves, 18th century Comanche captive
- Frank Chavez v. Netflix, American class-action lawsuit
