= Mendanha State Park =

State park in Rio de Janeiro, Brazil

- Parque Estadual do Mendanha
- IUCN category II (national park)
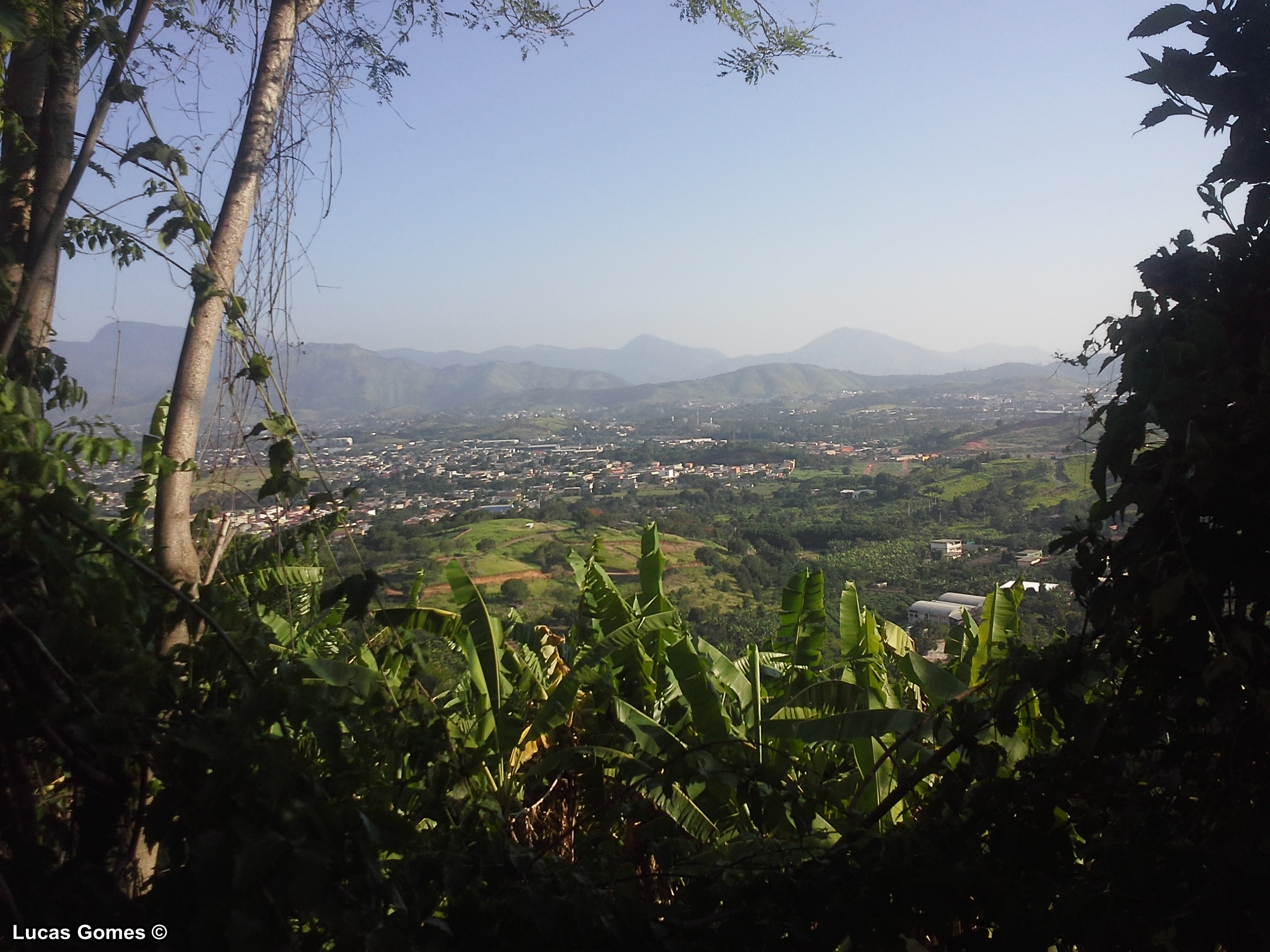
- Serra do Mendanha, Campo Grande

- Location within Brazil
- Nearest city: Nova Iguaçu, Rio de Janeiro
- Coordinates: 22°48′47″S 43°31′15″W
- Area: 4,398.1 ha (16.981 sq mi)
- Designation: State park
- Created: 2013
- Administrator: INEA

The Mendanha State Park (Portuguese: Parque Estadual do Mendanha is a state park in the state of Rio de Janeiro, Brazil.

== Location ==
The Mendanha State Park is divided between the municipalities of Nova Iguaçu and Mesquita, Rio de Janeiro. It has an area of 4,398.1 hectares (10,868 acres). The park fully protects the third rocky massif of the metropolitan region, and forms a mosaic of conservation units with the Pedra Branca State Park and the Tijuca National Park. The park contains many tributaries of the Guandu River, which supplies water to the municipalities of the city of Rio de Janeiro and the Rio Grande region.

== History ==
The Gericino / Mendanha Massif was declared an Atlantic Forest Biosphere Reserve by UNESCO in 1992. Before the park was created the area was protected by an environmental protection area, a less strict form of protection than a state park. At the time of creation the state environmental secretary Carlos Minc said the massif had been suffering from clandestine mining, illegal extraction of natural resources, and uncontrolled leisure and tourism activities.

The Mendanha State Park was created by state decree 44.342 of 22 August 2013. The objectives are to protect and assist the recovery of the natural environment and landscapes of great scenic beauty, a densely forested area that shelters rare and endangered species, as well as to protect the water resources of the region. The park is part of the Carioca Mosaic, established in 2011. An environmental police unit was to be established to patrol the park by 2014.

The federal government filed an action in 2015 against the state of Rio de Janeiro to suspend creation of the park on the grounds that much of it is on federal land that was being used as the army's Gericinó Training Area. The firing range is dangerous due to live explosive devices. The army had not been consulted in the meetings before creation of the park, and the state seemed to have ignored the fact that much of the land was federal property.

== Environment ==
The park holds forest remnants with a high level of biodiversity. Flora include jequitibá-rosa (Cariniana legalis) and cedro-rosa (Cedrela fissilis). Fauna include jaguarundi (Puma yagouaroundi), lowland paca (Agouti paca) and a reduced population of tufted capuchin (Sapajus apella).

== Sources ==
- Alencar, Emanuel (28 August 2013), "Estado cria parque para proteger as florestas do Mendanha", G1 Globo (in Portuguese)
- Celso de Mello (9 March 2015), União questiona criação do Parque Estadual do Mendanha, no RJ (in Portuguese), Supremo Tribunal Federal
- Mosaico Carioca de Áreas Protegidas (in Portuguese), MMA
- Parque Estadual do Mendanha (in Portuguese), INEA
