= Pedra Branca State Park =

State park in Rio de Janeiro, Brazil

- Parque Estadual da Pedra Branca
- IUCN category II (national park)
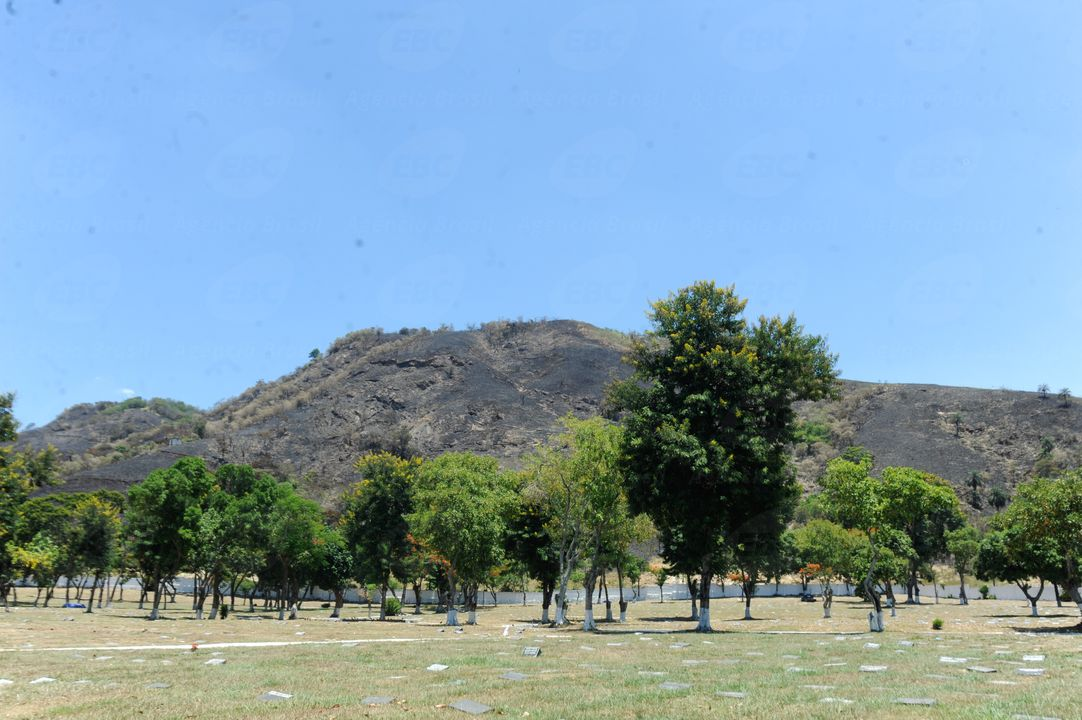
- Burned area in the park (hill in background) in 2014

- Location within Brazil
- Nearest city: Rio de Janeiro, RJ
- Coordinates: 22°56′26″S 43°28′50″W
- Area: 12,394 ha (47.85 sq mi)
- Designation: State park
- Created: 28 June 1974
- Administrator: Fundação Instituto Estadual de Florestas (IEF)
- Location in Rio de Janeiro

The Pedra Branca State Park (Portuguese: Parque Estadual da Pedra Branca) is a state park in the state of Rio de Janeiro, Brazil. It is one of the largest urban nature parks in the world. It protects an area of Atlantic Forest in the west of the city of Rio de Janeiro that includes the highest point in the city, the Pico da Pedra Branca.

== Location ==
The Pedra Branca State Park is in the west of the city of Rio de Janeiro, and has an area of 12,394 hectares (30,630 acres). It is one of the largest urban nature parks in the world. The park contains the Pico da Pedra Branca, the highest point of the city at 1,024 metres (3,360 ft). (Note: There is a rock 3 metres (9.8 ft) high at the top of the Pico da Pedra Branca, and this is just enough to make the mountain higher than the 1,021 metres (3,350 ft) Pico da Tijuca. The Pedra Branca (White Rock) is a block at the top of the mountain that was made white by the waste of vultures.) It is surrounded by the neighborhoods of Guaratiba, Bangu, Realengo, Jacarepaguá, Barra da Tijuca, Recreio dos Bandeirantes, Grumari and Campo Grande. The park contains the chapel of São Gonçalo do Amarante, built in 1625, and the church of Nossa Senhora de Monserrat, built in 1776.

The park provides water to the Pau da Fome, Camorim, Taxas and Engenho Novo dams. The aqueduct that cuts through the park takes water from the Guandu River to Rio's south zone. The park occupies about 10% of the city, and protects more than half of the city's Atlantic Forest.

== History ==
European occupation of the Pedra Branca range began late in the 16th century, when Salvador Correia de Sá donated lands in the area to his sons in 1594. At the end of the 17th century, some of the land was donated to Benedictine monks, who developed farms and cattle fields. By the end of the 19th century, there were extensive coffee plantations, and a movement developed against the resulting deforestation that resulted in some efforts at reforestation. In the early 20th century the old coffee plantations were divided into smaller banana plantations.

The Camorim Water Treatment Unit and Pau da Fome Dam were built in 1908. The Camorim dam supplies water for 20,000 people. An aqueduct was built in the 1960s at what is now the Piraquara Center. The massive growth of the city caused human occupation to spread uphill into the regenerating forests in the mid-20th century. The area of the Pedra Branca State Park was declared of public utility for the purpose of expropriation by decree-law 1634 of April 1963.

After a long period of studies, the park was formally created by state law No. 2377 of 28 June 1974. The area above 100 metres (330 ft) was included in the park. It is managed by the State Forest Institute Foundation (IEF). In 2003 the state government launched a R$4 million program to revitalize the park. This included a permanent exhibition "Da Pedra Branca ao Pau da Fome" for students that describes the geology, flora and fauna. The park is part of the Carioca Mosaic and has been recognized by UNESCO as an Atlantic Forest Biosphere Reserve.

== Environment ==
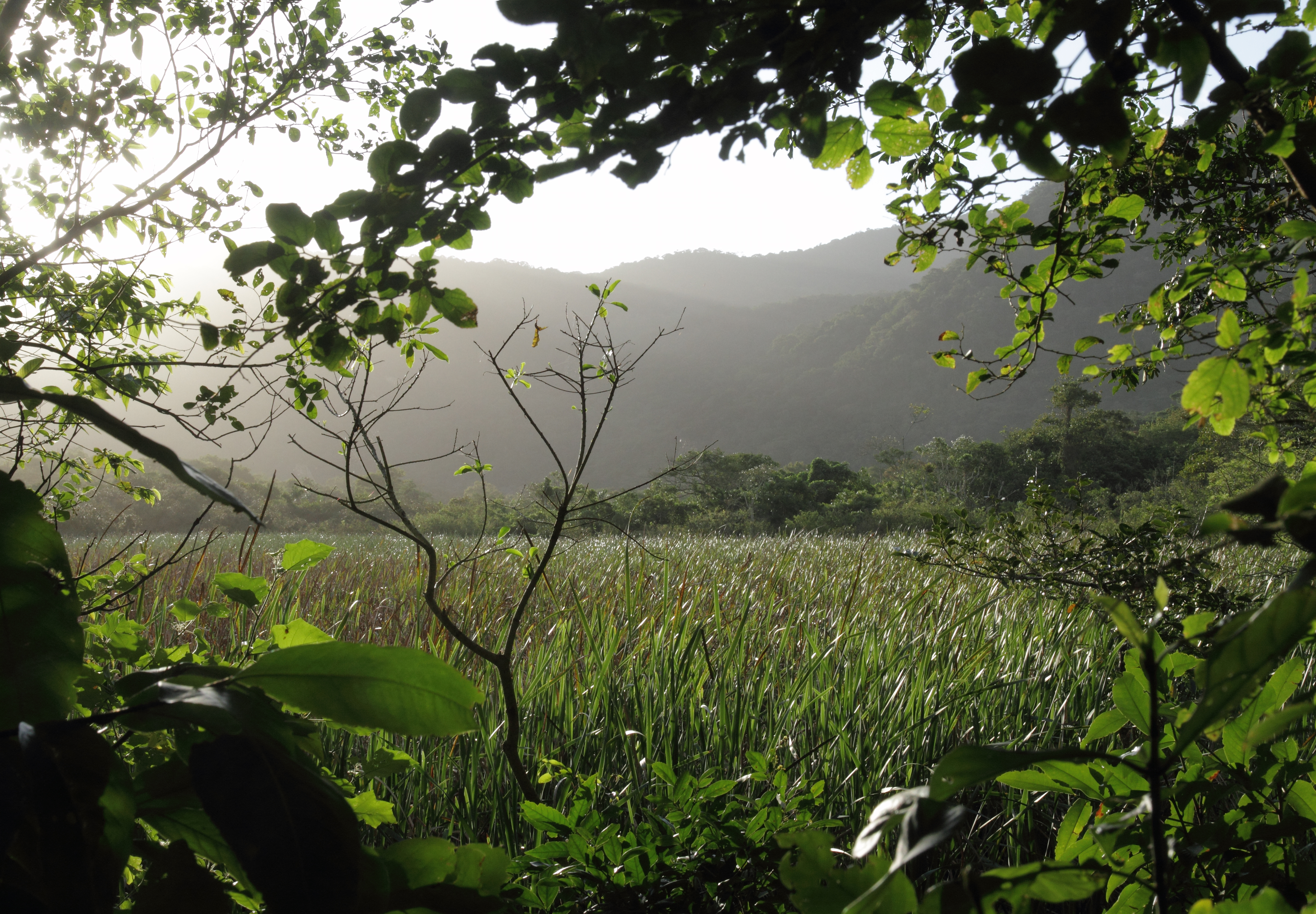
Small swamp at Grumari

The city of Rio de Janeiro has a humid tropical climate, with maximum rainfall in December - March and least rainfall in June - August. Annual rainfall averages 1,500 to 2,500 millimetres (59 to 98 in), with most rain in the summer. Usually the winds blow from the mainland towards the sea in the morning, and from the southeast in the afternoon and evening. The Pedra Branca Massif affects the flow of air and moisture throughout the city. The north slopes are warmer and drier, while the slopes facing west, south and east are more temperate and humid.

The park contains typical Atlantic Forest vegetation. Vegetation is in different stages of regeneration. The dominant type is dense rainforest. 934 species of flora in 118 botanical families have been cataloged, of which 429 have some level of endemism. The endemic bromeliad Neoregelia camorimiana is found in forests in an advanced stage of regeneration. These are mostly in the Camorim region and include species such as Brazilwood (Caesalpinia echinata), copaíba (Copaifera lucens), Brazilian rosewood (Dalbergia nigra), and red fig tree (Ficus americana).

338 species of birds have been identified, of which 20 are threatened to some extent, such as the white-eared parakeet (Pyrrhura leucotis). There are 51 species of mammals of which 8 are threatened. The fruit bat morcego-fruteiro-claro is vulnerable to extinction in Brazil. Threatened species include collared peccary (Pecari tajacu), brown-throated sloth (Bradypus variegatus), southern tamandua (Tamandua tetradactyla), channel-billed toucan (Ramphastos vitellinus), rusty-margined guan (Penelope superciliaris), brown-backed parrotlet (Touit melanonotus), boa constrictor (Boa constrictor) and striped worm lizard (Ophiodes striatus). There are 43 species of fish of which 5 are endangered.

The park is surrounded by large urban areas, and is under intense human pressure. As of 2013 there were 40 park rangers and the state's first environmental police unit. Fires are common in the driest part of year, from June to July, often caused by candle-powered paper hot air balloons released in festivals, but are quickly suppressed.

== Visiting ==
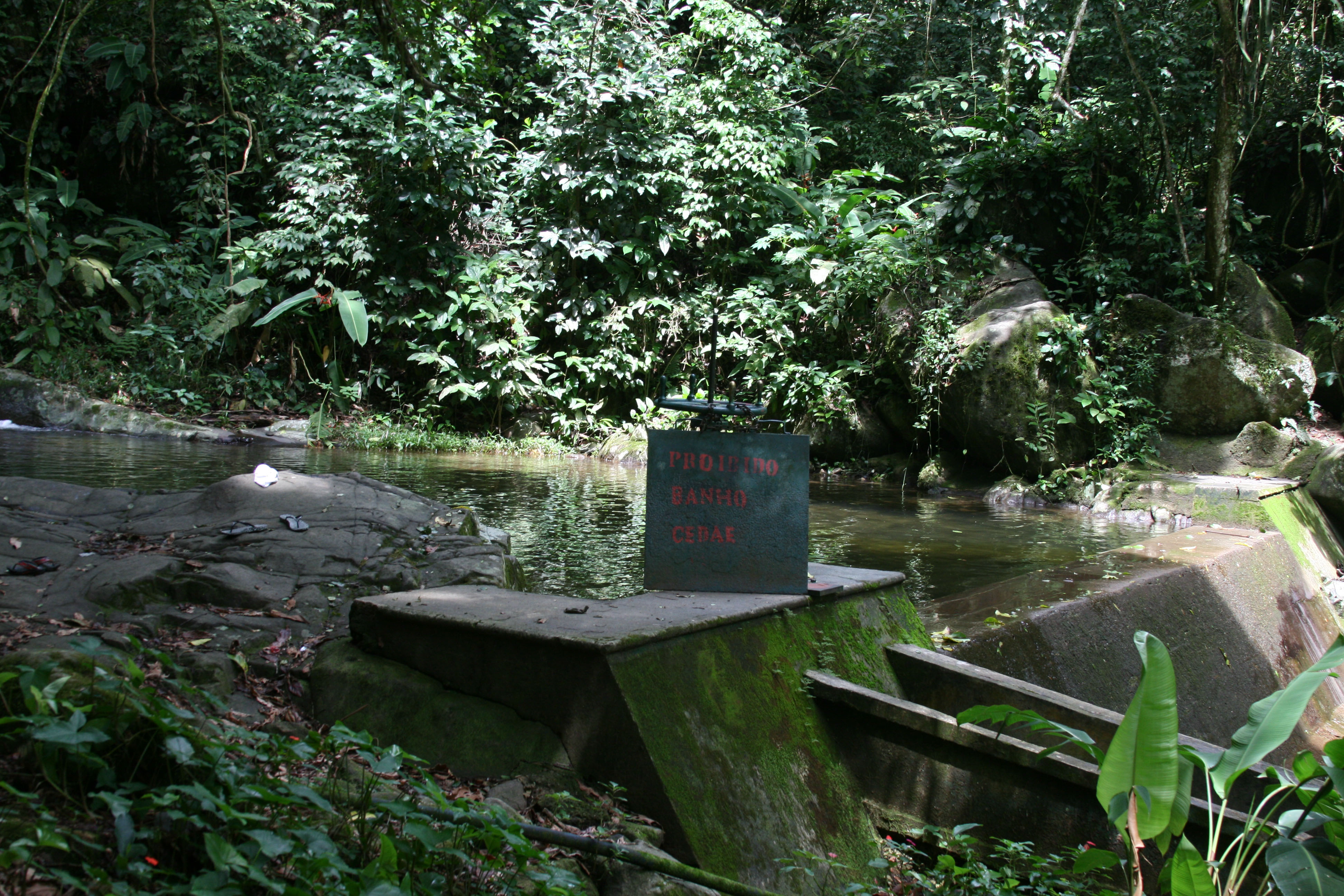
Dam at Pau da Fome

As of 2013 there were an average of 3,000 visitors per month, or 36,000 annually, but the park management aimed to attract up to 60,000 visitors per year by 2016. The park is open daily from 8am to 5pm.

=== Centers ===
PEPB has three administrative centers: Pau da Fome, Camorin and Piraquara. The park headquarters is in the Pau da Fome Center in Taquara, Jacarepaguá. It has an exhibition center in the building designed by the architect Zanine Caldas for Eco 92. The Camorin Center, also in Jacarepaguá, has a water collection and treatment system and a trail leading to the Camorim Dam. The Piraquara Center in Realengo has a nursery for seedlings. The center has a visitor building, toilets, leisure areas and environmental guides. The Cachoeira do Barata (Barata Waterfall) in the Piraquara center is one of the biggest attractions. The waterfall is in fact a series of falls and stretches of the Piraquara River that can be used for relaxation, with an artificial swimming pool at the foot. Beside it there is a children's playground, exercise equipment, tables and picnic areas.

=== Trails ===
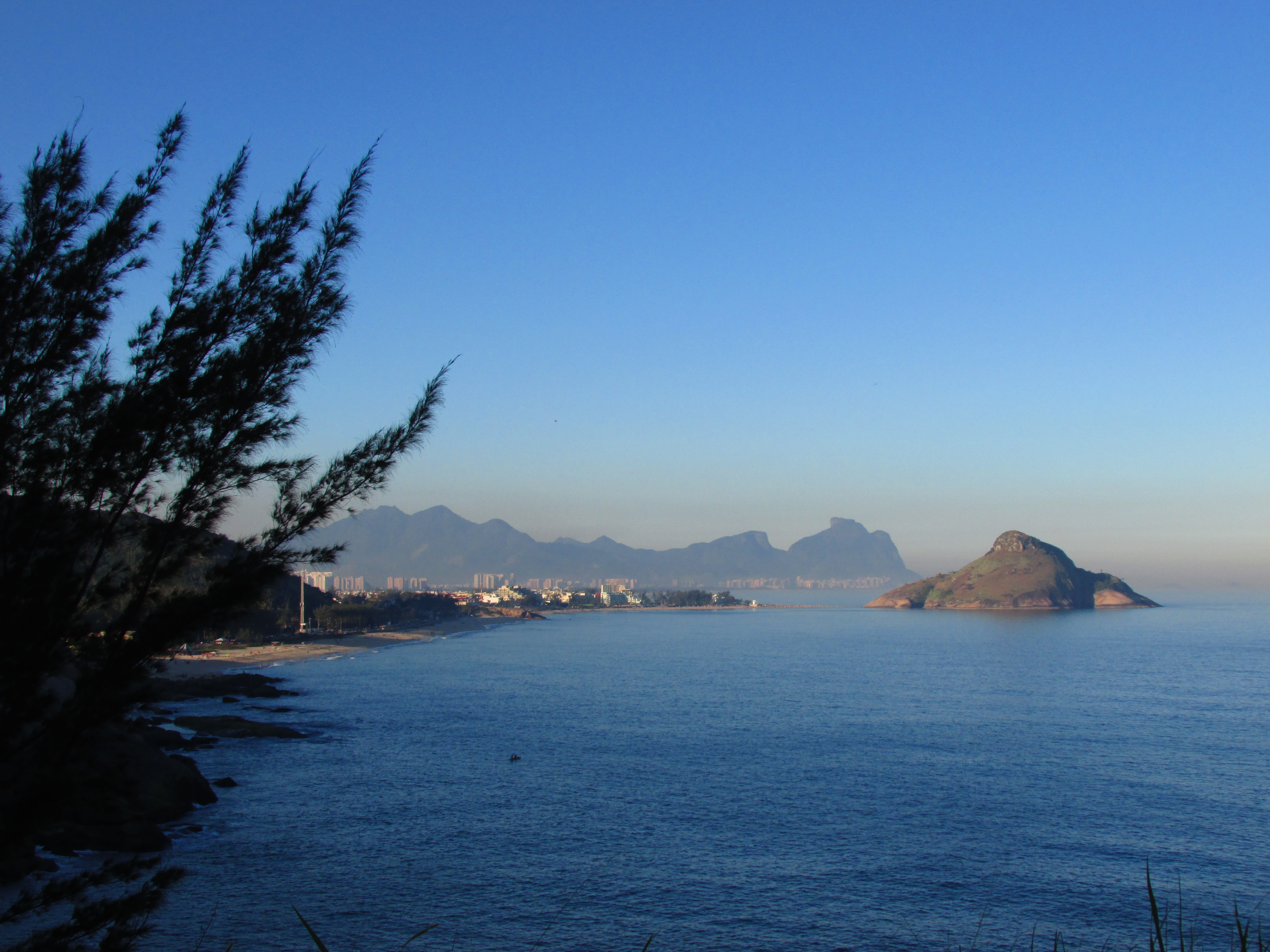
Grumari Beach

There are several ecological trails and walks. Guided tours are available, including an 11 kilometres (6.8 mi) walk to the top of the Pedra Branca. The bi-lingual Portuguese/English trail guide with maps and photographs was published by INEA in 2013. The trails have different lengths and levels of difficulty to cater to all tastes.

- The 250 metres (820 ft) Circuito das Águas Trail passes waterfalls weirs and dams.
- The 800 metres (2,600 ft) Rio Grande Trail with descriptive signs is at the Pau da Fome center, designed for all ages. Attractions include the 19th century aqueduct, the Figuera Dam, a corner of the Padaria Dam, and typical bromeliads and tree of the Atlantic Forest.
- The 3 kilometres (1.9 mi) Açude Camorim Trail, starting at the Camorim Center, has a view of the Camorim reservoir, which is about one quarter of the Rodrigo de Freitas Lagoon.
- The 3 kilometres (1.9 mi) Piabas-Grumari Crossing leads to Grumari Beach, where visitors may bathe, and includes gazebos and dense Atlantic Forest vegetation.
- The 3.5 kilometres (2.2 mi) Santa Bárbara Trail is one of the most popular, and leads from the Pau a Fome to the Pico da Pedra Branca, with steep stretches. The Pico da Pedra Branca trail, leading to the highest point, is long but easy.
- The shorter Pedra do Quilombo trail is harder, and includes a 10 metres (33 ft) exposed section on a rock face where a steel cable and metal foot rests have been installed.
- The 4 kilometres (2.5 mi) Caverna Carlos Bandeira Trail leads to and through the 30 metres (98 ft) Carlos Bandeira cave.
- The 11 kilometres (6.8 mi) crossing from Rio da Prata to Pau da Fome, via Monte Alegre, crosses the Pedra Branca massif. It is the hardest trail, with a maximum altitude of 793 metres (2,602 ft). It has natural lookouts, rivers, waterfalls and Atlantic Forest vegetation.
- The 11.8 kilometres (7.3 mi) crossing from Jacarepaguá to Campo Grande follows sections of an old colonial road, and remnants of the stone pavement are still visible.

== Sources ==
- Ortiz, Fabíola (2 December 2013), Parque Estadual da Pedra Branca ganha guia de trilhas (in Portuguese), O Eco
- "Parque Estadual da Pedra Branca", Guia da Semana
- "Parque Estadual da Pedra Branca – RJ", Trilhas e Rumos (in Portuguese)
- "Programão do RJTV tem visita ao Parque da Pedra Branca", G1 Globo (in Portuguese), 20 February 2016
- Santos, Eduardo Lage; Castro, Hugo de (2013), TRILHAS Parque Estadual da Pedra Branca (PDF) (in Portuguese), Rio de Janeiro: inea
