= Chávez =

Chávez (Spanish) or Chavez may refer to:

== People ==
- Chávez (surname), including:
  - César Chávez (1927–1993), American civil rights pioneer, labor leader, and co-founder of the United Farm Workers
  - Julio César Chávez (born 1962), Mexican boxer who held multiple world titles and holds the longest undefeated streak in boxing history
  - Linda Chavez (born 1947), Neuvomexicana and Maryland transplant whose career spans business, labor, national politics, state politics, and conservative commentary
  - Eric Chavez (born 1977), American Major League Baseball third baseman from 1998 to 2014 who won six Gold Gloves with the Moneyball-era Oakland Athletics
  - Martin Chávez (born 1952), American politician who served three terms as mayor of Albuquerque, New Mexico, from 1993 to 1997 and 2001 to 2009
  - Hugo Chávez (1954–2013), founder of the revolutionary socialist movement MBR-200 and president of Venezuela from 1999 to 2013

== Entertainment ==
- Chavez (band), an indie rock band in New York in the 1990s
- Cesar Chavez (film), 2014 Mexican-American film

== Games ==
- Chavez, the Spanish-language version of Riddick Bowe Boxing released in Mexico
- Chavez II, the Spanish-language version of Boxing Legends of the Ring released in Mexico

== Places ==
- Colegio Cesar Chavez, a defunct college named after César Chávez, operating from 1973 until 1983
- Chavez Island in Antarctica
- Chavez Island (Galápagos), a former name of Santa Cruz Island in Ecuador

== See also ==
- Chaves (disambiguation)
- Chavda
