= Carioca Mosaic =

Conservation area in Brazil

- Mosaico Carioca
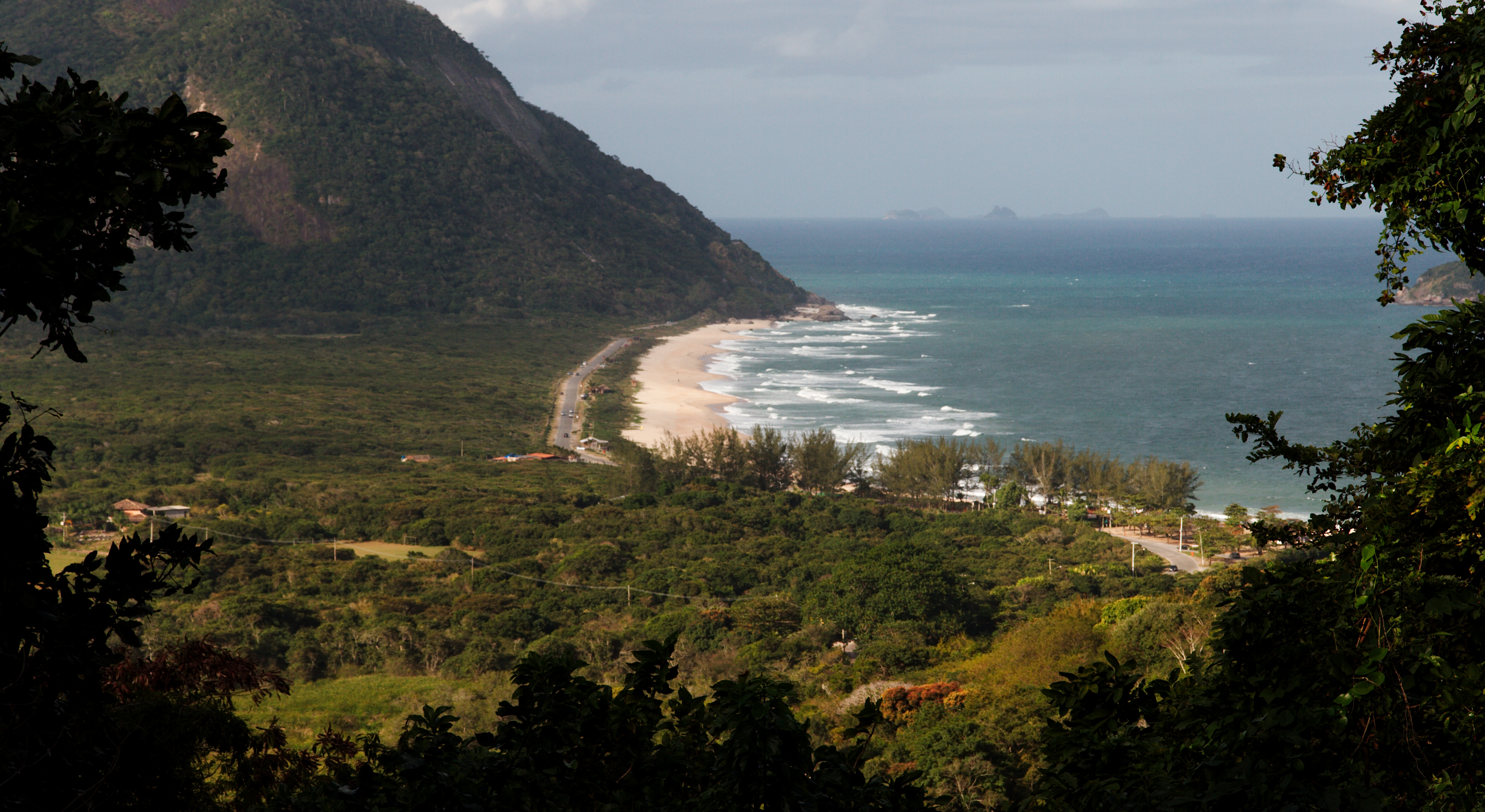
- Praia Grumari from the Pedra Branca State Park

- Location within Brazil
- Nearest city: Rio de Janeiro, RJ
- Coordinates: 22°56′26″S 43°28′50″W
- Designation: Protected area mosaic
- Created: 11 July 2011
- Administrator: MMA

The Carioca Mosaic (Portuguese: Mosaico Carioca) is a protected area mosaic in the state of Rio de Janeiro, Brazil. It includes various federal, state and municipal conservation units in and around the city of Rio de Janeiro.

== History ==
The Carioca Mosaic was created by ordnance 245 of 11 July 2011. It included conservation units administered at the federal, state and municipal levels. The federal Chico Mendes Institute for Biodiversity Conservation (ICMBio) administers the Tijuca National Park and Ilhas Cagarras Natural Monument. The Rio de Janeiro State Secretariat for the Environment administers the Pedra Branca State Park, Gericinó/Mendanha and Sepetiba II environmental protection areas, and Guaratiba Biological Reserve. The Rio de Janeiro Municipal Secretariat for the Environment administers 14 municipal nature parks, two environmental protection area and a natural monument.

The mosaic is coordinated at the federal level. The consultative council includes administrators of the various protected areas and representatives of other public and private bodies. The mosaic headquarters is at the headquarters of the Tijuca National Park.

== Protected areas ==
Conservation units in the mosaic include:

Conservation unit	Level	Established	Area (ha)
Bosque da Barra Municipal Nature Park	Municipal	1983	54
Catacumba Municipal Nature Park	Municipal	1979	30
Chico Mendes Municipal Nature Park	Municipal	1989	44
Cidade Municipal Nature Park	Municipal	2008	47
Darke de Mattos Municipal Nature Park	Municipal	1976	7
Fonte da Saudade Municipal Nature Park	Municipal	2000	2
Freguesia Municipal Nature Park	Municipal	1992	20
Gericinó/Mendanha Environmental Protection Area	State	2005	105
Grumari Municipal Nature Park	Municipal	2001	794
Guaratiba Biological Reserve	State	1974	3,600
Ilhas Cagarras Natural Monument	Federal	2010	106
José Guilherme Merquior Municipal Nature Park	Municipal	2000	8
Marapendi Municipal Nature Park	Municipal	1978	248
Mendanha State Park	State	2013	1,445
Sugarloaf Mountain and Urca Hill Natural Monument	Municipal	2006	122
Paisagem Carioca Municipal Nature Park	Municipal	2013	160
Pedra Branca State Park	State	1974	12,394
Penhasco Dois Irmãos Municipal Nature Park	Municipal	1992	38
Prainha Municipal Nature Park	Municipal	1999	147
Sepetiba II Environmental Protection Area	State	2004	194
Serra da Capoeira Grande Municipal Nature Park	Municipal	2002	21
Tijuca National Park	Federal	1961	3,359

== Sources ==
- Mosaico Carioca (in Portuguese), ICMBio, archived from the original on 2017-01-18
- Mosaico Carioca de Áreas Protegidas (in Portuguese), MMA
- Mosaicos de áreas protegidas (in Portuguese), ISA: Instituto Socioambiental, archived from the original on 2016-06-20
- Portal Brasil (12 July 2011), Meio Ambiente reconhece Mosaico Carioca de áreas protegidas (in Portuguese)
- Teixeira, Izabella (11 July 2011), Portaria nº 245 de 11.07.2011 - DOU 12.07.2011 (PDF) (in Portuguese), MMA, archived from the original (PDF) on 2017-01-18
