= Guaratiba Biological Reserve =

State-level Guaratiba State Biological Reserve, located in Rio de Janeiro

- IUCN category Ia (strict nature reserve)
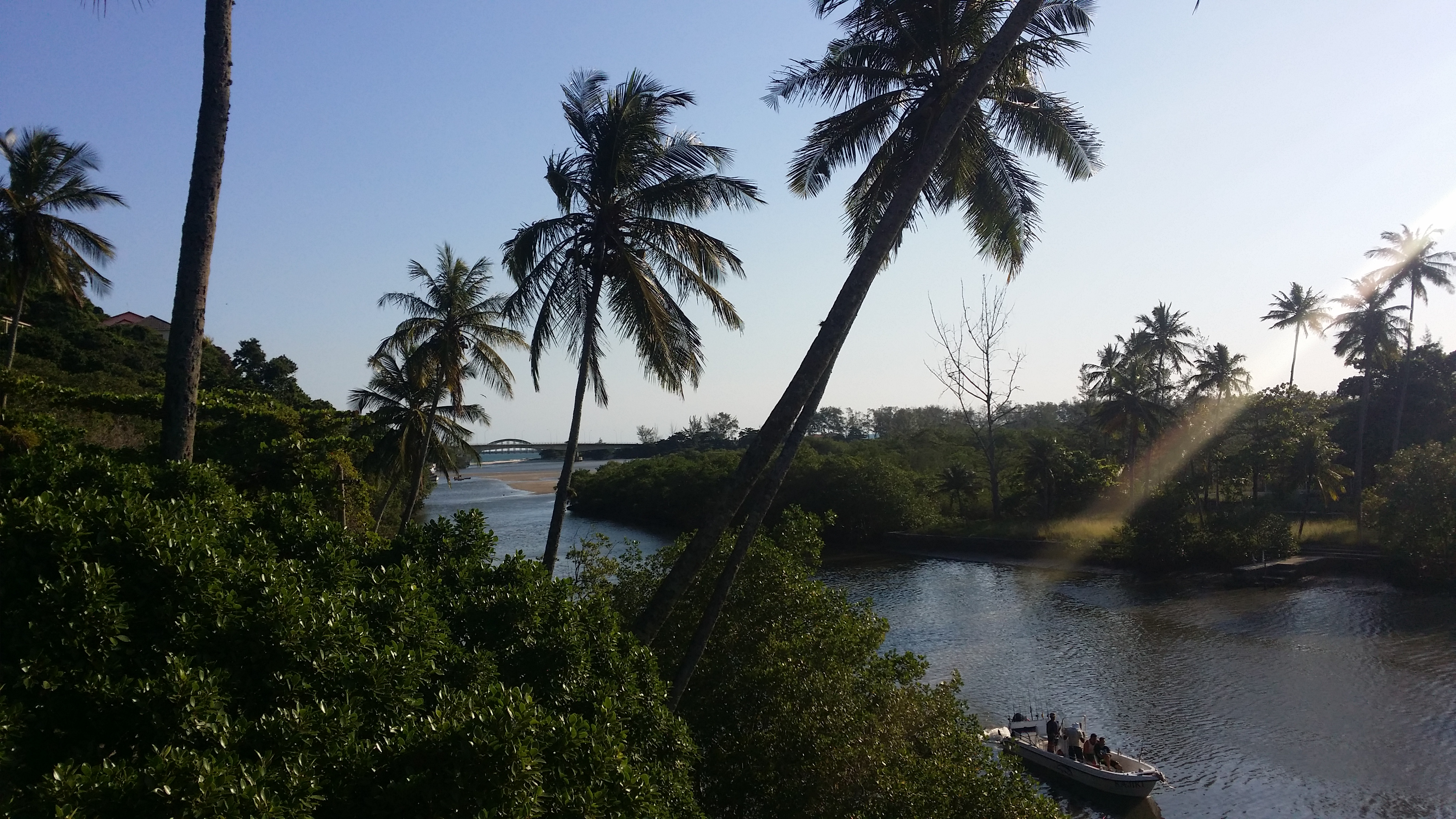
- Mangrove area in Barra de Guaratiba, Rio de Janeiro

- Location within Brazil
- Nearest city: Rio de Janeiro
- Coordinates: 23.0123°S 43.5936°W
- Area: 2,800 hectares (6,900 acres)
- Designation: Biological reserve
- Created: 20 November 1974

Guaratiba Biological and Archeological Reserve is a State biological reserve located in the western zone of Rio de Janeiro city, in the State of Rio de Janeiro, Brazil. It protects an important area of mangroves and wetlands in the east of Guaratiba Bay.

== Location ==
The reserve is in the Guaratiba bairro in the eastern part of Sepetiba Bay. It covers about 3,360 hectares (8,300 acres) and protects an important remnant of mangrove in the metropolitan area of Rio de Janeiro. The mangroves cover 1,600 hectares (4,000 acres) and are the best preserved in the state. The reserve also includes wetlands and modified areas in various stages of regeneration. There are 34 archaeological sites in the reserve, with the artifacts under the custody of the National Museum. It remains an important staging point for migratory birds.

== History ==
The Guaratiba Biological and Archaeological Reserve (Reserva Biológica e Arqueológica de Guaratiba) was created on 20 November 1974. It takes its name from the ibises (guarás) that used to frequent the area. Urbanized areas were removed from the reserve, while other ecologically important areas were added during the years that followed.

The reserve was redefined by State Law No. 54.015 on 31 March 1982, with an area of 2,800 hectares (6,900 acres). This law assigned the area to the army, which built some housing, now disused. Further changes to its boundaries were made on 10 December 2002. On 3 December 2010, it was recategorized as the Guaratiba State Biological Reserve (Reserva Biológica Estadual de Guaratiba), with full protection under the National Conservation Areas System (SNUG). The reserve is part of the Carioca Mosaic, established in 2011.

== Conservation ==
The State Biological Reserve is a "strict nature reserve" under IUCN protected area category Ia, with a terrestrial area of 3,611 hectares (8,920 acres). With this classification, the objective is to fully protect the biota without direct human interference. The reserve is part of the Atlantic Forest Reserve, declared by UNESCO in 1992. It is also part of the Biodiversity Corridor of the Serra do Mar and of the Carioca Mosaic, which was created on 11 July 2011.

In January 2011, the State Environmental Institute (INEA) said it planned to build a fence around the reserve to discourage intruders. When questioned about the effect on local crab harvesters, who had no other means of livelihood, INEA stated that this activity was illegal, but as a temporary measure on a case-by-case basis, some crab harvesting would be allowed. The goal was to fully eliminate it.

== Sources ==
- Lobo, Felipe (3 January 2011), Após 30 anos, soluções para Guaratiba (in Portuguese), Associação O Eco
- Mosaico Carioca de Áreas Protegidas (in Portuguese), MMA
- Portal Guaratiba (16 January 2011), INEA esclarece dúvidas sobre a Reserva Biológica Estadual de Guaratiba (in Portuguese)
- Labbish, Ning Chao; Chim Figueiredo, Mário Roberto; Kirby-Smith, William W. (1985), Proceedings of the International Symposium on Utilization of Coastal Ecosystems: Planning, Pollution and Productivity 21–27 November 1982, Rio Grande, Brazil: Editora da FURG, ISBN 85-85042-09-5
- Reserva Biológica Estadual de Guaratiba (in Portuguese), INEA, archived from the original on 2019-05-04
- Triana, Elisa (29 May 2009), "Strict Nature Reserves in Brazil", The Encyclopedia of Earth
