= Ilhas Cagarras =

Archipelago in Brazil

- Cagaras Islands
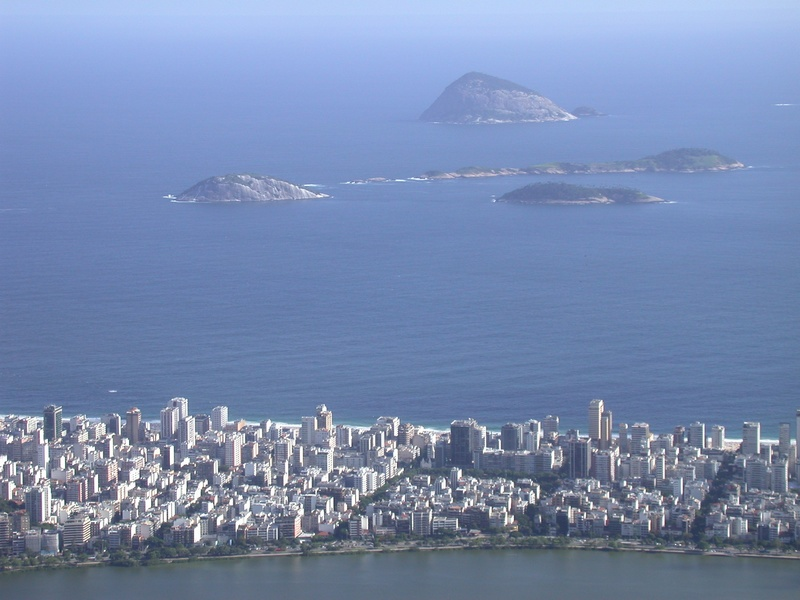
- A view of Ipanema from Corcovado. The Cagarras Islands can be seen on the background, along with islands Redonda and Redondinha further at the back.

- Location within Brazil
- Nearest city: Rio de Janeiro, Brazil
- Coordinates: 23°01′49″S 43°12′01″W
- Area: 523 ha (1,290 acres)
- Designation: Natural monument
- Created: 13 April 2010
- Administrator: Chico Mendes Institute for Biodiversity Conservation

The Ilhas Cagarras (Cagarras Islands) are an uninhabited archipelago located 5 km (3.1 miles) off Ipanema, a major beach of the southern coast of the city of Rio de Janeiro, Brazil. They have been designated a federal natural monument since 2010.

== Location ==
The archipelago is in the municipality of Rio de Janeiro, in the state of Rio de Janeiro. It has an area of 523 hectares (1,290 acres). It is an important area for fisheries and tourism, and is subjected to upwelling of cold waters during summer. The water quality is relatively poor due to its close proximity with Rio's city waste water disposal. The islands are nonetheless frequented by day excursions of eco-tourists. The archipelago consists of the following islands ("ilha" in Portuguese means island, "ilhota" = islet):

- Ilha Cagarra
- Ilha de Palmas
- Ilha Comprida
- Ilha Filhote
- Ilhota Grande
- Laje de Cagarra

The first three are the largest. Ilha Cagarra, the island group's namesake, is the tallest (79m/259 ft.) and most visible from land. Although the islands Ilha Redonda and Ilha Redondinha are located nearby, they are not part of the Cagarras archipelago.

== Origin of the name ==
There is no consensus among authors about the origin of the name of this archipelago. The most commonly accepted version is that the toponymy would is due to the large amount of excrement (in Portuguese, "cagádas" ) of seabirds that live, nest, and feed on these islands. After feeding mainly on fish, these birds excrete their feces, rich in calcium, on the rocky slopes of the islands, staining them white. This hue is clearly visible from the shore of Ipanema, one of the south beaches of Rio de Janeiro.

In 1730, its main island, appears on a nautical chart with a Frenchified name "Island Cagade." In another letter, dated 1767, the same appears with the island carrying its name in Portuguese: "Crappy Island." "Ilha Cagáda"

Another possibility for its name is that Portuguese sailors wrongly identified the frigatebirds (fragatas in Portuguese) that nest on these islands, with the Cory's shearwater (cagarras in Portuguese) seabirds that live in the archipelagos of Madeira and the Azores (Portuguese territories): the shearwater or cagarra (Calonectris borealis) is not found on Brazilian islands.

== History of the Archipelago ==
The islands are situated in proximity to the discharge in the sea of sewage from almost all the South Zone of Rio de Janeiro, through the Ipanema canal, an important work of sanitary engineering built in the 1970s in accordance with the Protocol of Annapolis. CONAMA proposed making the Ilhas Cagarras Archipelago and Area of Relevant Ecological Interest on 14 September 1989, but nothing was done at the time. Creation of the natural monument was due to the initiative of Mr Fernando Gabeira of the Green Party.

On 13 April 2010 the incumbent vice president José Alencar signed a decree creating the Cagarras Islands Natural Monument. The purpose was to preserve the remnants of the island ecosystem in the Atlantic Forest domain, to preserve the scenic beauty, and to maintain a refuge and nesting area for migratory shorebirds. The monument consisted of the Cagarras, Palmas and Comprida islands and the Filhote da Cagarra islet, as well as the water for 10 metres (33 ft) around the land. Any activity that could damage the ecosystem or disturb the aquatic fauna and sea birds was prohibited. The consultative council was created on 14 December 2010. The natural monument is part of the Carioca Mosaic, created in 2011.

== Sources ==
- Monteiro, Leandro C.; Muricy, Guilherme (2004), "Patterns of sponge distribution in Cagarras Archipelago, Rio de Janeiro, Brazil", J. Mar. Biol. Assoc. U. K., 84 (4): 681–687, doi:10.1017/S0025315404009750h
- MONAT das Ilhas Cagarras (in Portuguese), ISA: Instituto Socioambiental
- Mosaico Carioca de Áreas Protegidas (in Portuguese), MMA
