= Mesquita, Rio de Janeiro =

The Municipality of Mesquita
- Municipality
- Flag Coat of arms

- Localization of Mesquita in Rio de Janeiro.
- Coordinates: 22°48′19″S 43°24′55.91″W
- Country: Brazil
- Region: Southeast
- State: Rio de Janeiro
- Founded: September 25, 1999

Government
  - Mayor: Jorge Lúcio Ferreira Miranda (PSDB)

Area
  - Total: 39.062 km^{2} (15.082 sq mi)
  - Land: 41.490 km^{2} (16.019 sq mi)

Population (2022 Brazilian Census)
  - Total: 167,127
  - Estimate (2025): 178,830
  - Density: 4,028.1/km^{2} (10,433/sq mi)
- Time zone: UTC-3
- Website: www.mesquita.rj.gov.br

Mesquita (Portuguese for 'mosque'; pronounced [mesˈkitɐ]) is a municipality located in the Brazilian state of Rio de Janeiro. Its population was 167,127 (2022 Census) and its area is 42 km^{2} (16 sq mi).

The municipality contains part of the 4,398-hectare (10,870-acre) Mendanha State Park, created in 2013. The name is a reference to the second Baron of Mesquita, Jerônimo Roberto de Mesquita, the owner of the old farms (fazendas) in the present central region of the municipality.
