= Marcos Braz =

Brazilian politician

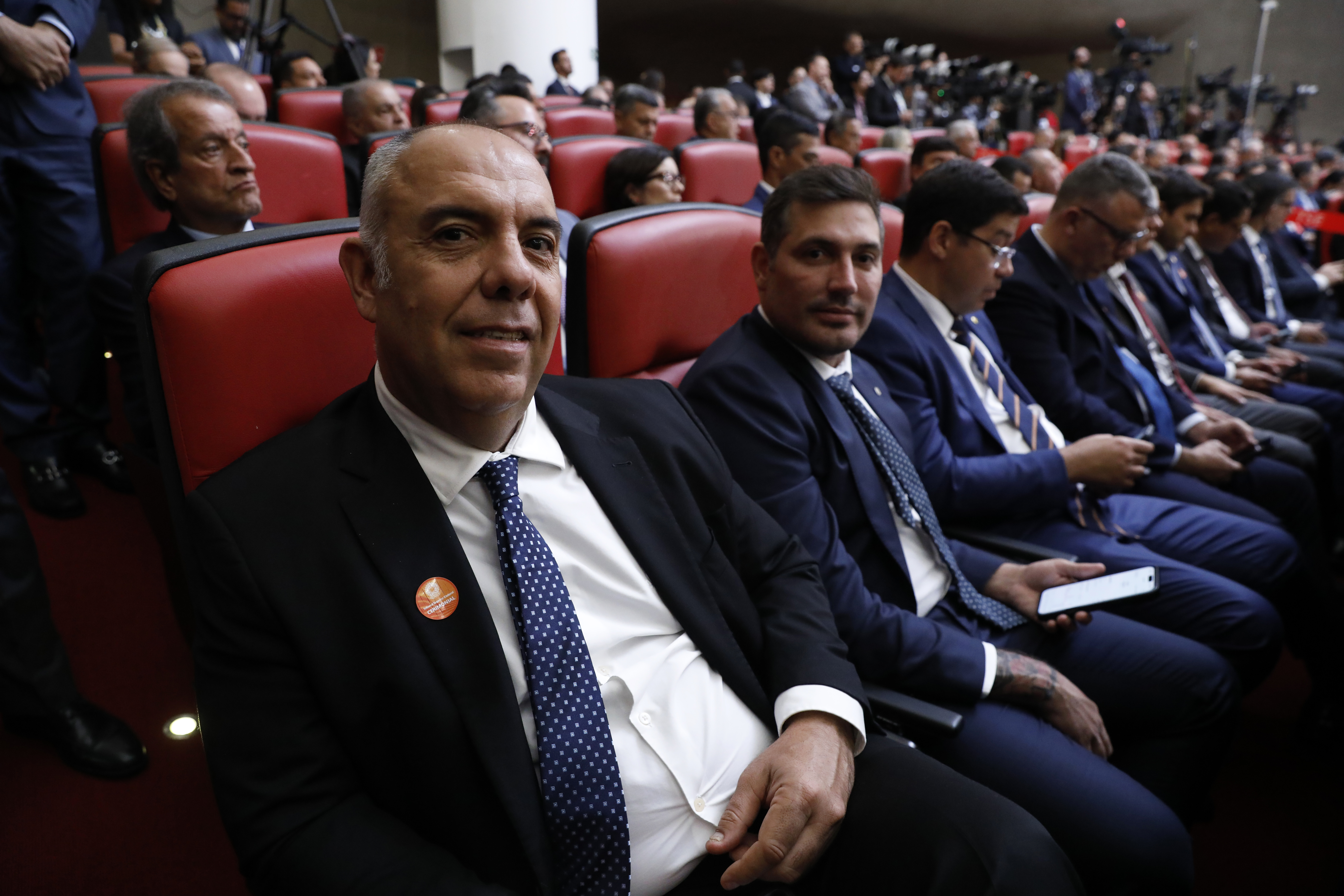
Braz in 2026.

Marcos Braz (born 1971) is a Brazilian politician who used to be the vice-president of Flamengo and now works as the executive director of Clube do Remo, from Belém.

== Early life ==
Braz was born in Nova Iguaçu, Brazil.

== Career ==
Braz has worked as Secretary of Sports and Leisure of Rio de Janeiro, Brazil.

== Personal life ==
Braz has been married to Ana Paula Barbosa. He has two children.
