= Marcos Chaves =

Brazilian artist (b. 1961)

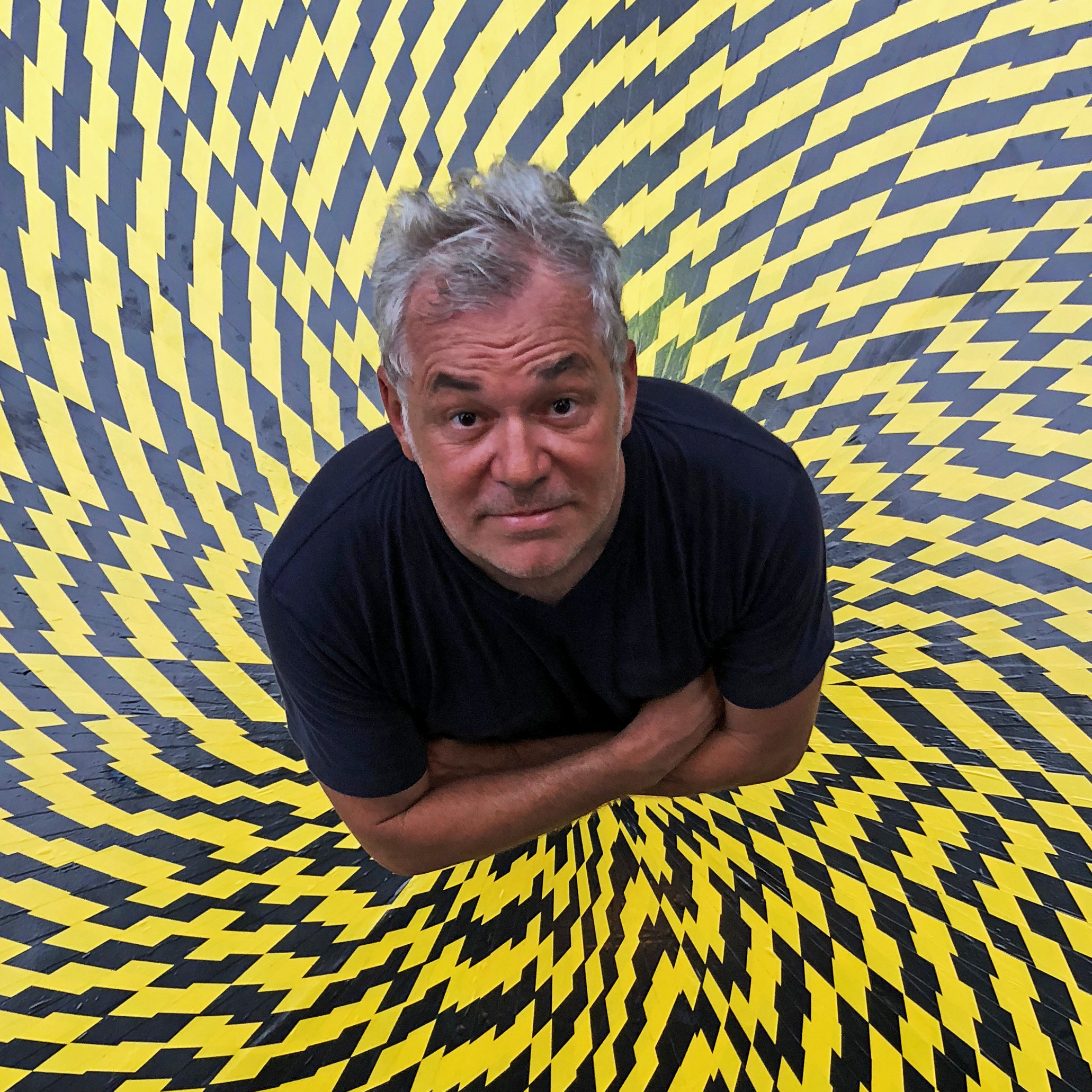
- Portrait of Marcos Chaves with his work "Logradouro"
- Born: January 18, 1961 (age 65); Rio de Janeiro, Brazil
- Known for: Contemporary Art and Photography
- Website: www.marcoschaves.net

Marcos Chaves (born 1961, Rio de Janeiro) is a Brazilian contemporary artist.

== Art practice ==
Marcos Chaves' art practice has been evolving since the 1980s throughout a range of works and projects spanning across media and mediums, including text, sound and video installations, assemblages, photography and site-specific projects. Mostly known and recognized through gestures of appropriation and intervention, Chaves searches for different meanings, or manoeuvres the existing ones inherent to objects, words and life situations. His work extracts poetry and alternative representations by shifting the values of ordinary, everyday objects, landscapes and words.

“Marcos Chaves surprises meanings and values that are immersed in vulgar things, dissimulated by habit or convention. He makes unpredictable displacements and produces assemblages in a tone of parody distilling his acute observations of the world, from technology to rubbish.” writes Brazilian art critic Ligia Canongia.

== Early life and education ==
Marcos Chaves was born in Rio de Janeiro in January 1961 as the youngest of seven children. He grew up in the neighborhood of Santa Teresa where he continues to have his studio. As a teenager, he was very close to his aunt, Mara Chaves who worked for the architects Wilson Reis Netto and José Zanine Caldas; this triggered his training in architecture and urbanism (1979) at Universidade Santa Ursula where he attended classes with Lygia Pape who had an important influence on him. He also took classes at the Visual Arts School of Parque Lage where many of his peers taught or trained, and at the Museo de Arte Moderna where Rubens Gerchman taught him painting.

In 1984, he traveled to Italy and studied art history while working as an assistant with the Italian comic artist and satirist Francesco Tullio Altan. It was from Altan from whom he learned the value of direct humor which one finds in most of Chaves' works. While in Italy, he met Antonio Dias, an influential figure in Brazilian contemporary art, who invited him to work as his assistant in Milan. During this period he was introduced to Arte Povera artists and aesthetics, another inspiration for his later work.

Upon his return to Brazil in 1985, he met Leonilson, a major artist in the Brazilian scene with whom he began a regular dialogue about art. Together they experimented with four-hands paintings. During this period, Chaves developed a studio practice and started working on his first assemblages and object-based works, shifting his interest from painting to what has shaped his current conceptual, language and text-based, and photographic practice.

== Important works ==
=== Eu Só Vendo A vista, 1997 (Conceptual photography) ===
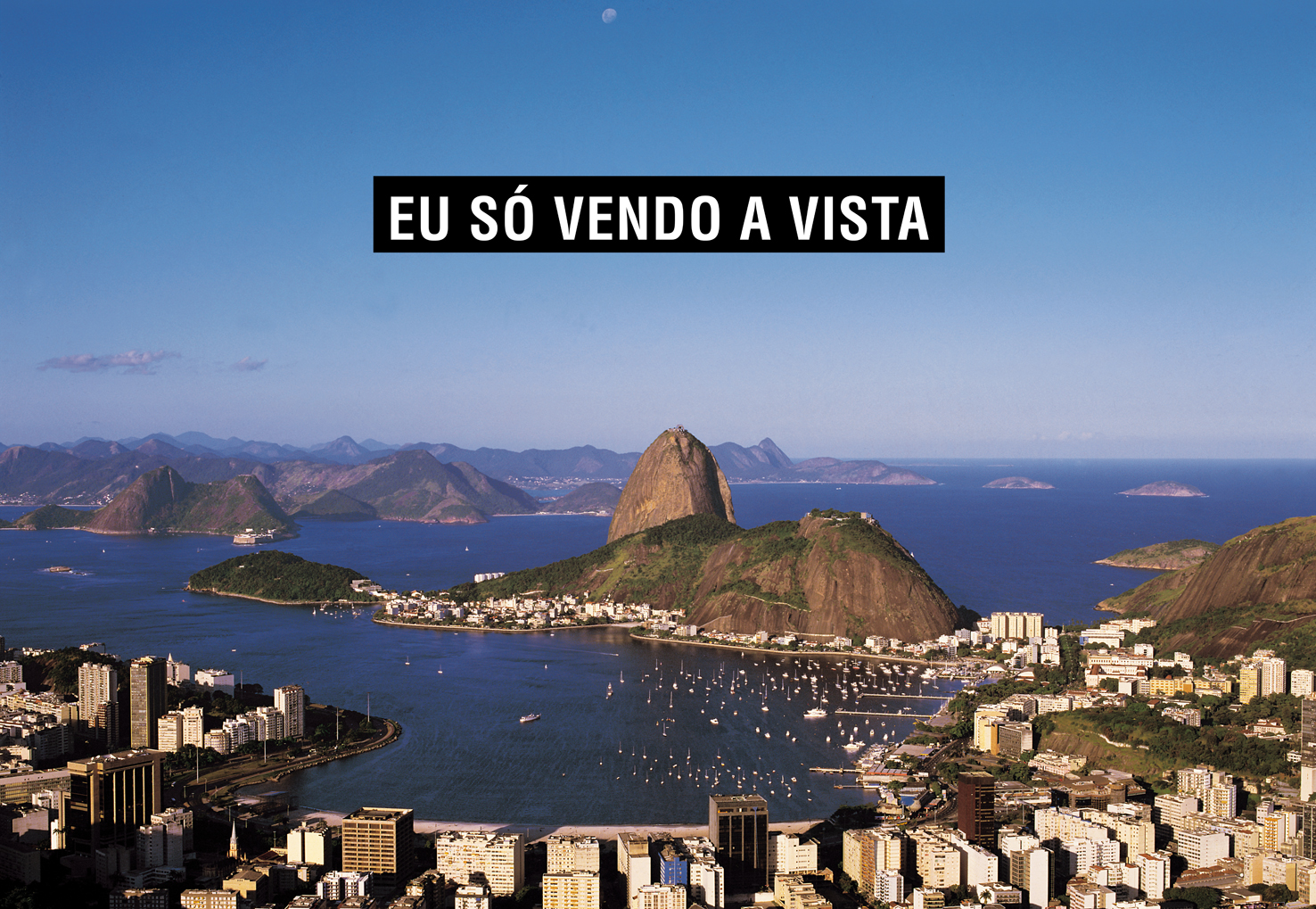

Marcos Chaves' most notable photographic work, Eu só vendo a vista (1997), takes as its main subject Rio de Janeiro's iconic view of the Sugar Loaf mountain found on tourist postcards and collectively associated with the landscape of the city. This view, shot from a very traditional angle becomes almost invisible for having been overly represented and used.

As an attempt to restore a relationship with it, Chaves takes this image to the field of art and transposes onto it a sentence which holds many semantic ambiguities: Eu só vendo a vista.

Playing around with the words vista (view, eyesight), the meaning of the expression à vista (cash) as well as vendo (depending on the conjugation means selling, seeing, and concealing) one could read the different sentences:

- Eu só vendo a vista = I only sell the view
- Eu só vendo à vista = I only sell for cash
- Eu só, vendo a vista (with an added comma) = I alone or lonely, see the view.
- Só eu vendo a vista (words swapped) = Only I sell the view / sight

The work addresses themes related to art, photography, and the role of the artist in society. It also examines the influence of market transactions, such as buying and selling, within the fields of art and photography.

By questioning the meaning of overselling Rio de Janeiro's iconic view to mere merchandise (on postcards), Chaves asserts his ownership and power to sell that view as an artist.

From a sociological perspective this work dissects and determines power relations between the artist and his social space (his city and its urban fabric), the artist and his eyesight (his photographic language) as well as the artist's role in a neoliberal economy of image and photography circulation. The question of value is inherent to the work, as it alludes to a form of payment (cash) but also to images that have different economic values while they represent the same view. On the one hand a cheap reproducible postcard, while on the other, an expensive limited edition photographic artwork.

This work which apparently questions the meaning and value of Rio de Janeiro's view, actually also addresses deeper meanings and values relating to the nature of a work of art and the position of the artist in an image-selling world. The play with amental associations triggered by words is filled with humor and a hint of cynicism as in most of the artist's works.

=== Buracos (Holes), 1996 (photographic series) ===
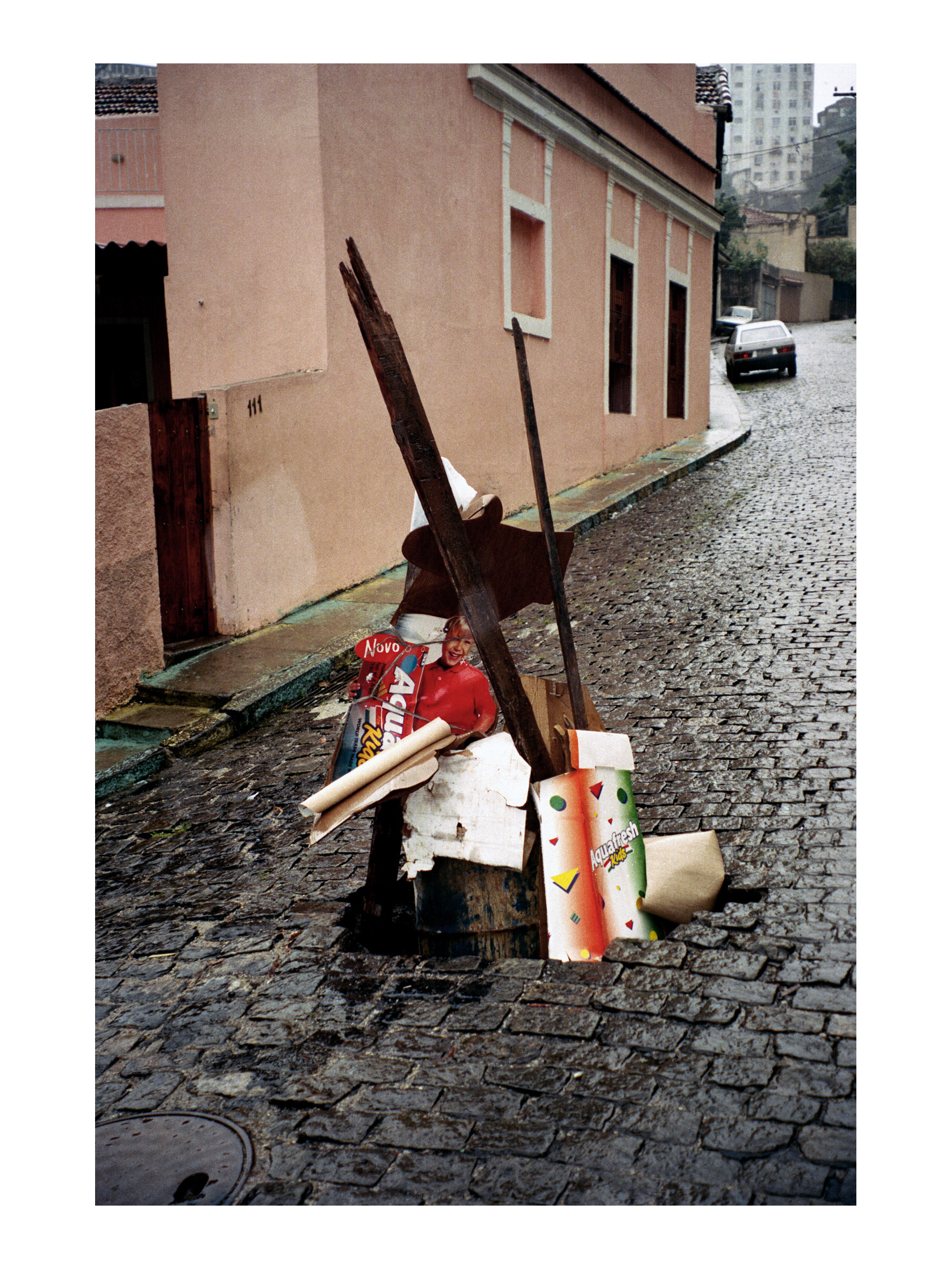
Hole Series, 1996

For the last three decades, Marcos Chaves has been photographing the holes in Rio de Janeiro's streets and the ready-made sculptures they become when residents fill them up with objects as a warning for pedestrians and cars. It is an ongoing cartographic and archival project about the city, photography, sculpture and street interventions—all at once. A map of the city could be generated from this methodical archive, resembling the process of an urban anthropologist, extracting meaning and sense from the city's urban fabric and the way its users inhabit it or fill its holes.

[…] the series Buracos (Holes) is at the same time several indistinct things: it is a collective sculpture, a public installation, a popular intervention, and also a conceptual appropriation, an urban ready-made, a photography and, last but not least, a political work, and not necessarily in this order, for here what matter is multiplication and not sum
—Adolfo Montejo Navas.

Like true urban phantasmagoria, then, Marcos Chaves has been rescuing local street interventions in the fashion of Kurt Schwitters-like apparitions. For each hole is a liability in the city's public power, a symbolic fissure that is opened, a popular homage to the dangers of faulting politics that the social imaginary represents as a fracture. Each hole is an intervention that plays with presences and absences (of ground, of emptiness, of structure, of signs) and that is read with an accomplice and sardonic irony. It is not the first time that the artist approaches the urban imaginary of his city with a transversal and humorous gaze, but this time the aesthetic itinerary is different.

[…]The photos of the holes are self-representations, in which object and idea couple in their raw material (the piece lifted in the street) and in its category of thought (the photographic and conceptual registration), but in order to arrive at perverse tautologies, which never stop incurring on several levels of understanding. There are other signs on the road. Thus in this collection of holes one can see much more than one thinks
—Adolfo Montejo Navas.

=== Laughing Mask, 2005 (video) ===
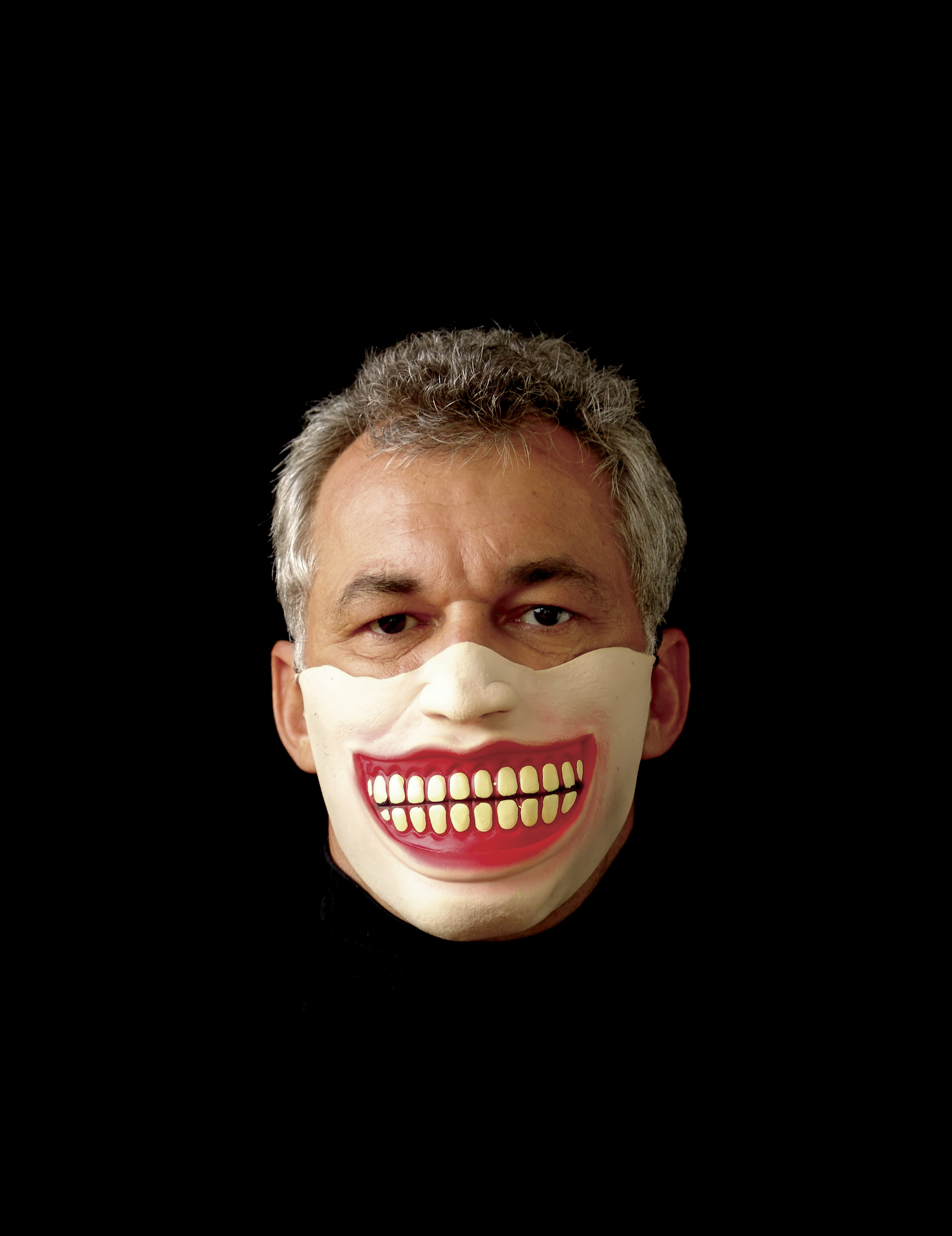

Laughing Mask is part of three self-portrait mask videos by Chaves. It shows a disembodied head floating in the middle of a black screen. A latex carnival mask the artist bought in the central street market of Rio de Janeiro covers the face from just below the eyes. It is dominated by a grotesquely over-sized mouth, fixed in a horrifying smile, which reveals two banks of yellow teeth.

Laughing Mask questions the boundaries between the 'reality' of the artist as person / persona and the 'fiction' of the artwork, keeping both perceptions in play simultaneously. As with the most unnerving comedy, there is no laughter soundtrack – viewers are left to decide for themselves in which of the ambiguities to place their trust.

[...]the mask carries, in the origin of its representation, the moral, political and poetic functions. Still, the mask has the potential of absorbing many of the issues that arouse the interest of the art territory in its modern acceptation: illusion, myth, allegory and simulacrum. In an even broader sphere, the mask touches the true/false dichotomy, a dilemma that, since Plato, has substantiated the aesthetic universe. The figure of the mask is not extraneous to the work of Marcos Chaves, and this has already been observed in the interventions that he carried out at Castelinho do Flamengo in 2000 when, using make-up, false eyelashes and other adornments, he transformed the eclectic-style sculptures into lively and hilarious images, like transvestites. There, he effected a deviation of the static nature of the statues, updating and ironizing the obsolete character of academic art, in addition to underscoring how much from eclecticism – which transits amidst various styles – was appropriated by the post-modern world.
—Ligia Canongia

=== Academia, 2014 (installation) ===
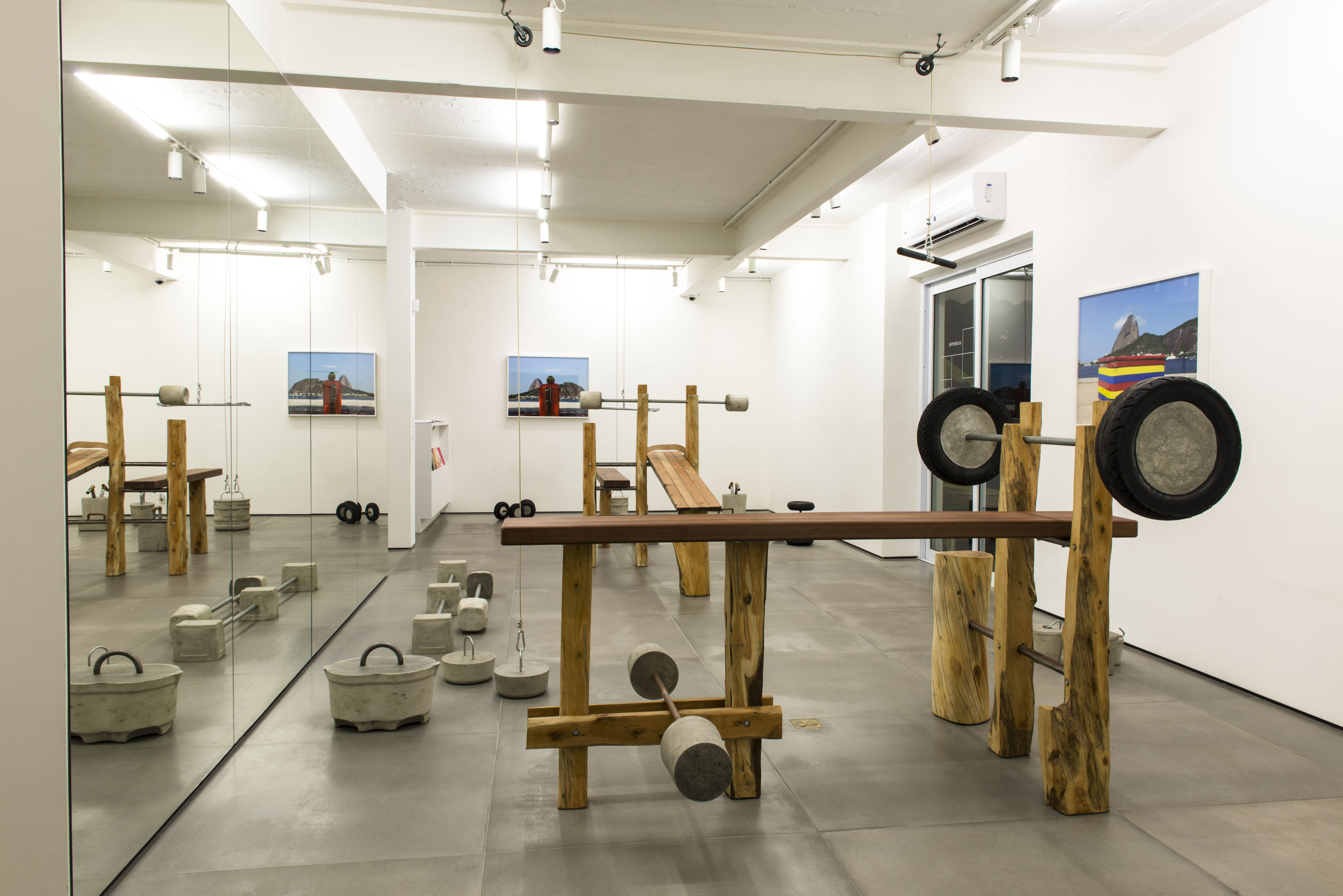

This work is an installation made of wooden, metal, concrete and plastic elements: sculptures of gym and weight lifting equipment. Inspired by the public open-air gyms of Rio de Janeiro, the work is a comment on the social structures which produce a form of living together and social cohesion which public services for all, allow for.

=== Vai Passar (?), 2019 (public art intervention) ===
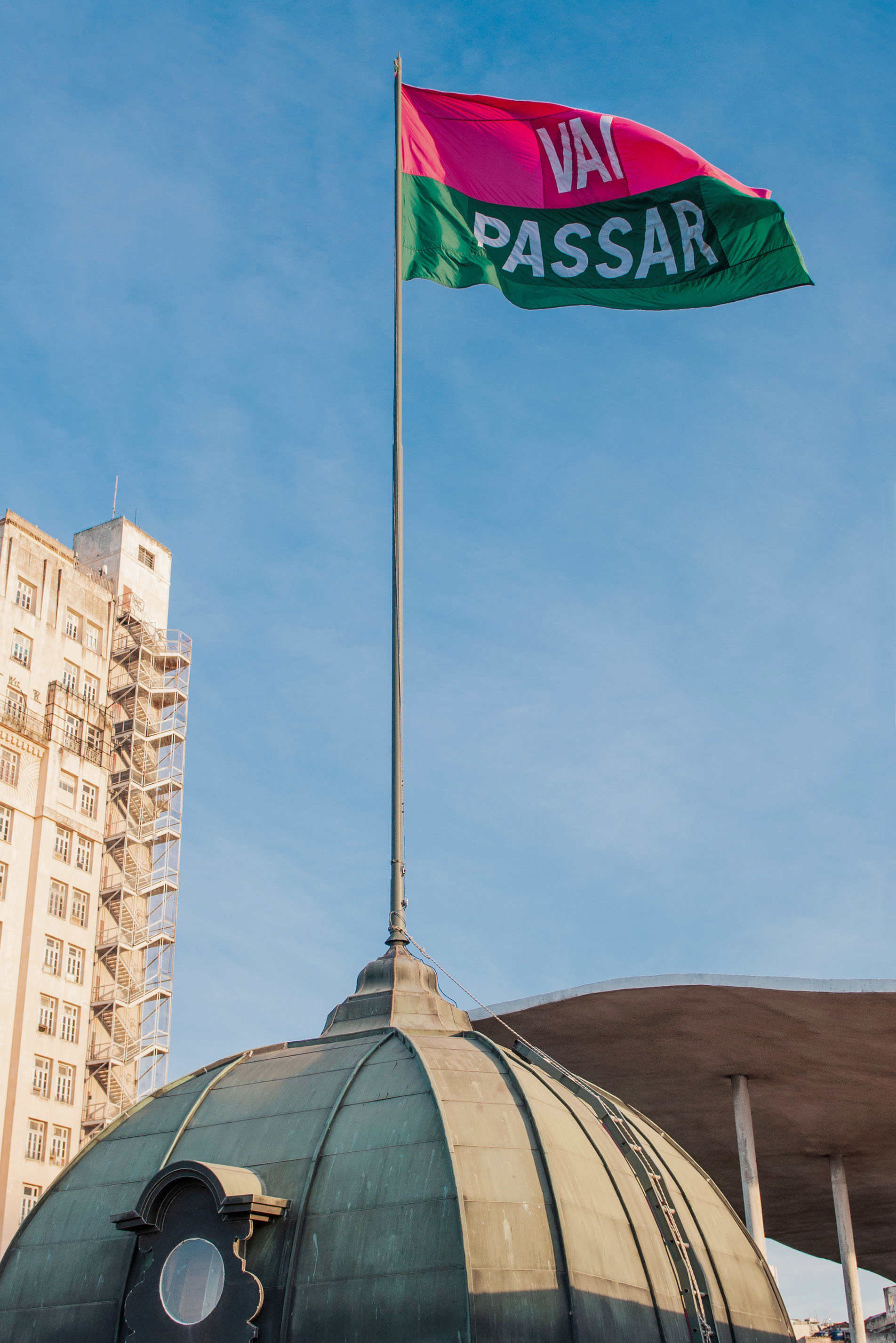

Vai Passar (?) is a monumental flag and public art intervention erected on the roof of the Museu de Arte do Rio, visible from the refurbished Orla Conde and from the bay. Commissioned by the MAR in 2019 - three months after Brazilian President Jair Bolsonaro's conservative government began governing Brazil - the work is rooted in Brazilian popular music and subtly addresses the crisis and conservatism the country is going through.

The flag holds the words Vai Passar (This too shall pass ? Will this pass ?) a direct reference to a title of a Chico Buarque song composed in 1980 during the military dictatorship. Sown on a green and pink shiny fabric, the flag refers to the colors of Brazil's first Samba School: Mangueira.

Marcos Chaves is not the first artist to establish a relation with Mangueira. This social structure is collectively acclaimed for its contribution to the music and genre of Samba in Brazil but foremost for its political and social engagement through the lyrics of the songs they create and the gender/ class composition of its members.

== Exhibitions ==
=== In Brazil ===
Marcos Chaves has had several solo and collective exhibitions in Brazil's major art institutions and biennials including the Museum of Art of Rio (MAR), Museum of Modern Art in Rio de Janeiro, The Museum of Contemporary Art of Niteroi (MAC), CCBB- Centro Cultural Banco do Brasil, 1st and 5th Biennials of Mercosul Porto Alegre, and the 25th International Biennial of São Paulo.

=== Internationally ===
His work has been part of major international exhibitions and collections including the Mori Art Museum (Tokyo – Japan); Martin-Gropius-Bau, Neuer Berliner Kunstverein – NBK (Berlin – Germany) Manifesta7 - The European Biennial of Contemporary Art, (Bolzano – Italy); Fri_Art Centre d'Art Contemporain (Freiburg, Switzerland); Calouste Gulbenkian Foundation (Portugal – Lisbon) Ludwig Museum (Koblenz – Germany); Vantaa Art Museum (Helsinki – Finland); Temporary Contemporary Space (Cardiff – UK); 4th Biennial of Havana (Cuba); VI Festival Images-Vevey Visual Arts Biennial: Extravaganza. Out of the Ordinary (Vevey, Switzerland); 17th Bienal de Cerveira - award (Cerveira, Portugal); Esbjerg Kunstmuseum (Esbjerg, Denmark); Kunsthal_KAdE (Amersfoort, the Netherlands); Santiago Museum of Contemporary Art (Santiago de Chile); CAB– Centro de Arte Caja de Burgos (Burgos, Spain); Northern Gallery (Sunderland, UK); Centro per l’Arte Contemporânea Luigi Pecci (Prato, Italy); Zeppelin Universität (Germany).

== Published books and catalogs ==
- NAVAS, A.M., L. CANONGIA and L. DUARTE, ed. ARTEBRA Marcos Chaves. ISBN 9788577340446, Casa da Palavra, 2007.
- CHAVES, Marcos, ed. Marcos Chaves. ISBN 9788578200183, Aeroplano editora, 2008.
- COCCHIARALE, Fernando, ed. Marcos Chaves. exhibition catalog in Casa de Cultura Laura Alvin, Rio de Janeiro, 2011.
- NAVARRO, Emílio, ed. MARCOS CHAVES. ARBOLABOR. ISBN 9788492637843, Caja de Burgos, Burgos, Spain, 2015.
