= Antonio Dias (artist) =

Brazilian artist and painter

- Born: February 22, 1944; Campina Grande, Paraíba, Brazil
- Died: August 1, 2018 (aged 74); Milan, Italy
- Known for: Painting, sculpture
- Movement: Tropicália

Antonio Manuel Lima Dias (February 22, 1944 – August 1, 2018), commonly known as Antonio Dias, was a Brazilian artist and graphic designer. He was a prominent figure during the concretist and Tropicália movements.

== Biography ==
Dias and his family moved from Campina Grande to Rio Janeiro in 1957. Here he began working as a graphic designer, experimenting with art in his free time. During the 1960s, Dias became a frequent visitor of the artist Oswaldo Goeldi's studio at the Escola Nacional de Belas Artes. He first worked with abstract geometrical sculptures, but later moved to paper and canvas. After having won the 1965 Biennale des Jeunes painting award in Paris, Dias moved to Paris in 1967. When he was denied an extension of his French papers in May 1968, he moved to Milan, Italy. Several visual artists were hired as his assistants, including Marcos Chaves (1961-). He lived in Milan until his death in 2018.

Even though Dias always rejected the association with the American Pop art movement, critics and curators have often drawn comparisons between his work and the movement. In 2015 he was included in Tate Modern's The World Goes Pop and told The New York Times “I always protest when I’m accused of being Pop — it’s not my party. ... Its images are like any other images.”
