= Ignacio Chávez =

Ignacio Chávez may refer to:

- Ignacio Chávez (politician), president of Nicaragua in 1891
- Ignacio Chávez Sánchez (1897–1979), Mexican physician, founding member of the Colegio Nacional
