= Orlando Chaves =

Orlando Chaves may refer to:

- Orlando Chaves (bishop) (1900–1981), Brazilian archbishop
- Orlando Chaves (water polo) (born 1963), Brazilian water polo player
- Orlando Chaves (weightlifter) (1921–1976), Guyanese weightlifter
