= Louis Chaves =

American serial killer (born 1943)

Louis Ralph Chaves
- Born: c. 1943 (age 82–83); Dominican Republic
- Status: Released
- Convictions: First degree murder Second degree murder (2 counts)
- Penalty: Life imprisonment

Details
- Victims: 3
- Span of crimes: 1968–1987
- Country: United States
- State: California
- Date apprehended: March 25, 1987

Louis Ralph Chaves (born c. 1943), also known as Louis Chavez or Louis Notclay, is a Dominican-born American serial killer who murdered a couple in El Monte, California, in 1968, and later a police officer in Hayward in 1987.

== Murders ==
In 1968, Chaves killed a man and woman in El Monte, California. For this, he served seven years at the California Men's Colony in San Luis Obispo. Manuel Velazquez, who had known Chaves since 1963, said that the victims were his landlords, with whom he had an ongoing dispute. Chaves was known as a religious man who claimed to receive messages from God, who would "come and tell him he was going to be a king". After his 1976 parole, he spent time in mental hospitals in New Jersey. Other friends of Chaves said that he had a history of emotional problems and moved to Hayward, California, in August 1986 after spending years living in an RV in New Jersey and Alaska.

In December 1986, Chaves spent nine days in jail and received two years of probation for biting a police officer and attempting to steal his gun in a San Leandro courtroom.

On March 25, 1987, Chaves parked his RV in front of a home in Hayward. Chaves was known by some in the area, and one woman on the street allowed him to use her mailing address. At 6:37 p.m., neighbors became suspicious of the vehicle and called the police. After three officers arrived, Chaves refused to leave his RV, threatening them and igniting spray from a can of carburetor cleaner at them. 29-year-old officer Benjamin Worcester went inside the camper to arrest Chaves, and during a struggle, Chaves picked up a 7-inch hunting knife and stabbed Worcester in the throat, severing a main artery and killing him. The other two officers were unaware of Worcester's death until they were placing Chaves in a police cruiser and noticed Worcester was not present.

== Trial ==
At his arraignment, Chaves wept openly and told the court to review his past so he could "rest [his] case" and "condemn [himself] in silence". Although originally ruled competent to stand trial, this was overturned in October 1988, and Chaves was sent to Atascadero State Hospital, where he underwent exams. He was again ruled competent to stand trial and was sentenced to 25 years to life in prison. In December 2022, Chaves was granted parole on medical grounds.

== See also ==
- Joseph Henry Burgess
- List of serial killers in the United States
