= Frank Chávez =

Venezuelan footballer (born 2005)

Personal information
- Full name: Frank Andrés Chávez Viloria
- Date of birth: January 6, 2005 (age 21)
- Place of birth: San Cristóbal, Táchira, Venezuela
- Height: 1.76 m (5 ft 9 in)
- Position: Right-back

Team information
- Current team: Zulia
- Number: 2

Senior career*
Years	Team	Apps	(Gls)
2021–	Zulia	3	(0)
- * Club domestic league appearances and goals as of 14:11, 25 July 2021 (UTC)

Frank Andrés Chávez Viloria (born 6 January 2005) is a Venezuelan footballer who plays as a right-back for Zulia.

== Career statistics ==
=== Club ===
As of 25 July 2021.

Club	Season	League			Cup		Continental		Other		Total	
Club	Season	Division	Apps	Goals	Apps	Goals	Apps	Goals	Apps	Goals	Apps	Goals
Zulia	2021	Venezuelan Primera División	3	0	0	0	0	0	0	0	3	0
Career total			3	0	0	0	0	0	0	0	3	0
