= Agnes Chavez =

Cuban American artist, educator and social entrepreneur

- Born: New York City, U.S.
- Education: California College of the Arts
- Known for: STEAM education, Installation Artist
- Notable work: (x)Trees
- Website: agneschavez.com

Agnes Chavez is a Cuban American artist, educator, and social entrepreneur. Her installation pieces often feature data visualization, sound, and image projection. Chavez has designed and created tools for STEAM education that focus on learning through art, language, and physics. She is the founder of the art and education programs Sube and STEMarts Lab, and is a co-founder of Paseo Project, an arts festival in Taos, New Mexico.

== Early life and education ==
Chavez was born and raised in New York City. Her parents were both from Cuba and they came to the United States as refugees.

In 1980, Chavez received an associate degree in Art from Miami Dade Community College. She went on to get her Bachelor of Fine Arts from California College of Arts and Crafts in 1984. In 1986, Chavez moved to Taos, New Mexico.

== Artwork ==
=== Light Forms: Jungle Rhythms ===
Chavez showed Light Forms: Jungle Rhythms in March 1993 at the Millicent Rogers Museum in El Prado, New Mexico. This piece combines technology and an appreciation for nature.

=== (x) Trees ===
In 2009, Chavez began to work with data visualization combined with projection art and created the installation piece, (x)Trees which was later shown at ISEA 2012. (x)Trees was a highlighted work at ISEA 2012. Chavez also served as Education Program Director for ISEA2012: Machine Wilderness Education Day. (x)Trees uses live data which is taken from the internet and projects this information as tree-like images which grow and change. The work was a collaboration between herself and computer programmers who developed the algorithms for the trees. Her team for (x)trees at ISEA 2012 was made up of herself, Jared Tarbell and Allesandro Saccoia. The data used to create the trees was taken from particular search words used in tweets from Twitter and text messages. Twilio was used to generate trees from SMS text messages so that anyone viewing x(Trees) could shape and interact with the art. Chavez's intent with using social media and text to generate the virtual trees is to show how individuals are digitally connected to one another. (x)Trees can also be installed almost anywhere, including outdoors.

=== Projecting pARTicles ===
Chavez does a large amount of research for her artwork. While working on the interactive installation, Projecting pARTicles, she collaborated with Dr. Steven Goldfarb, ATLAS Experiment at CERN to immerse herself in particle physics. She continued with a research stay in 2015, presenting outcomes at the CERN library.

=== Origination Point ===
Origination Point is a multimedia installation created in collaboration with Marcel Schwittlick (visual artist/software programmer) and Robert Schirmer (interactive sound). The installation uses sounds and vibrations of the Earth as recorded by NASA along with visuals of objects that look like particles and cells.

=== 12th Havana Biennial ===
In May 2015, Chavez showed her physics inspired work, Origination Point and the Projecting Particles youth workshop at the 12th Havana Biennial (Bienal de la Habana) in Cuba. She was invited by a curator from the Havana Biennial who saw (x)Trees at ISEA 2012. Projecting Particles at the Havana Biennial allowed young people to create "physics-inspired projection art" that was collaborative and took place on the streets of Havana. Projecting Particles at the Havana Biennial was made possible by a team of four, including Chavez as the creative lead. The others in the group were Markus Dorninger, a projection painter, Malu Tavares, a documentary filmmaker, and Dr. Luis Flores Castillo, physicist at CERN.

== Educational work ==
Chavez developed a new business in the mid-1990s. When her son was two years old, Chavez wanted to teach him to speak Spanish. She began to teach Spanish and at her son's preschool as a way to supplement income from her art. The process of teaching at the preschool gave Chavez an idea for a possible business. Chavez created a curriculum called Sube: Teaching Language thru Art, Music & Games, which is designed to help teachers inspire children to learn English and Spanish interactively. Sube allows teachers to use a multi-sensory approach to learning language and is divided into several different themes. The name, SUBE is a play on the Spanish verb, subir, meaning "to go up." Chavez created a business, Sube, Inc. out of the kit, which was noted to "fill an educational void."

Chavez is the founder of STEMArts, which brings science, technology, engineering and math (STEM) projects to young people in schools and at workshops. STEMArts is part of Sube, inc.

Since 2014, Chavez and Matt Thomas are the co-founders of Paseo Project, a yearly, interactive and community-focused arts festival in Taos, New Mexico.
