= Guaratiba =

- Neighborhood
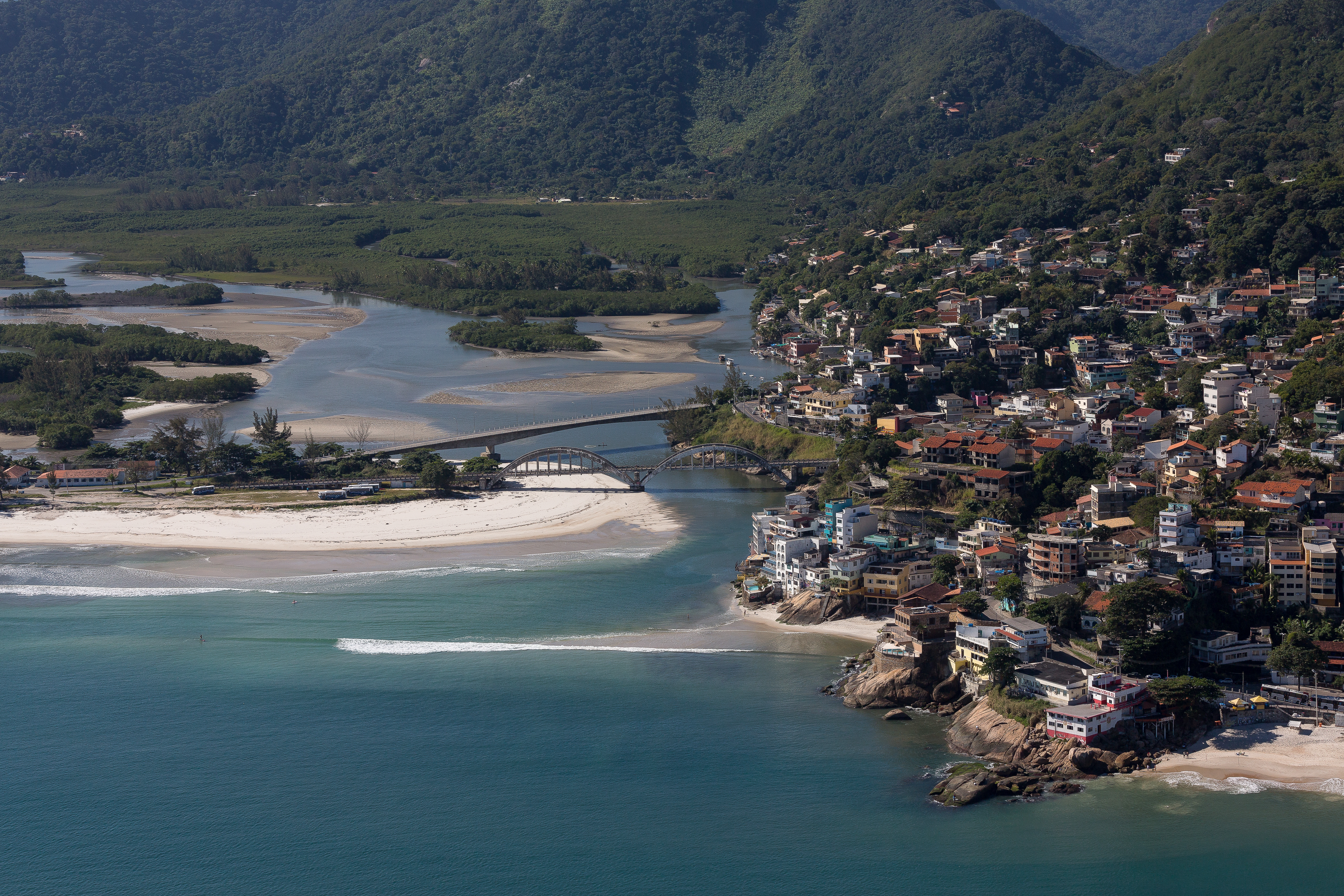
- Aerial view

- Location in Rio de Janeiro
- Coordinates: 23°04′05″S 43°33′42″W
- Country: Brazil
- State: Rio de Janeiro (RJ)
- Municipality/City: Rio de Janeiro
- Zone: West Zone

Guaratiba is a large neighborhood in the West Zone of Rio de Janeiro, Brazil, on the east side of Sepetiba Bay. Its population density is among the lowest in the city.

It contains the 3,360 hectares (8,300 acres) Guaratiba Biological Reserve, a strictly protected conservation unit holding a remnant of mangroves.

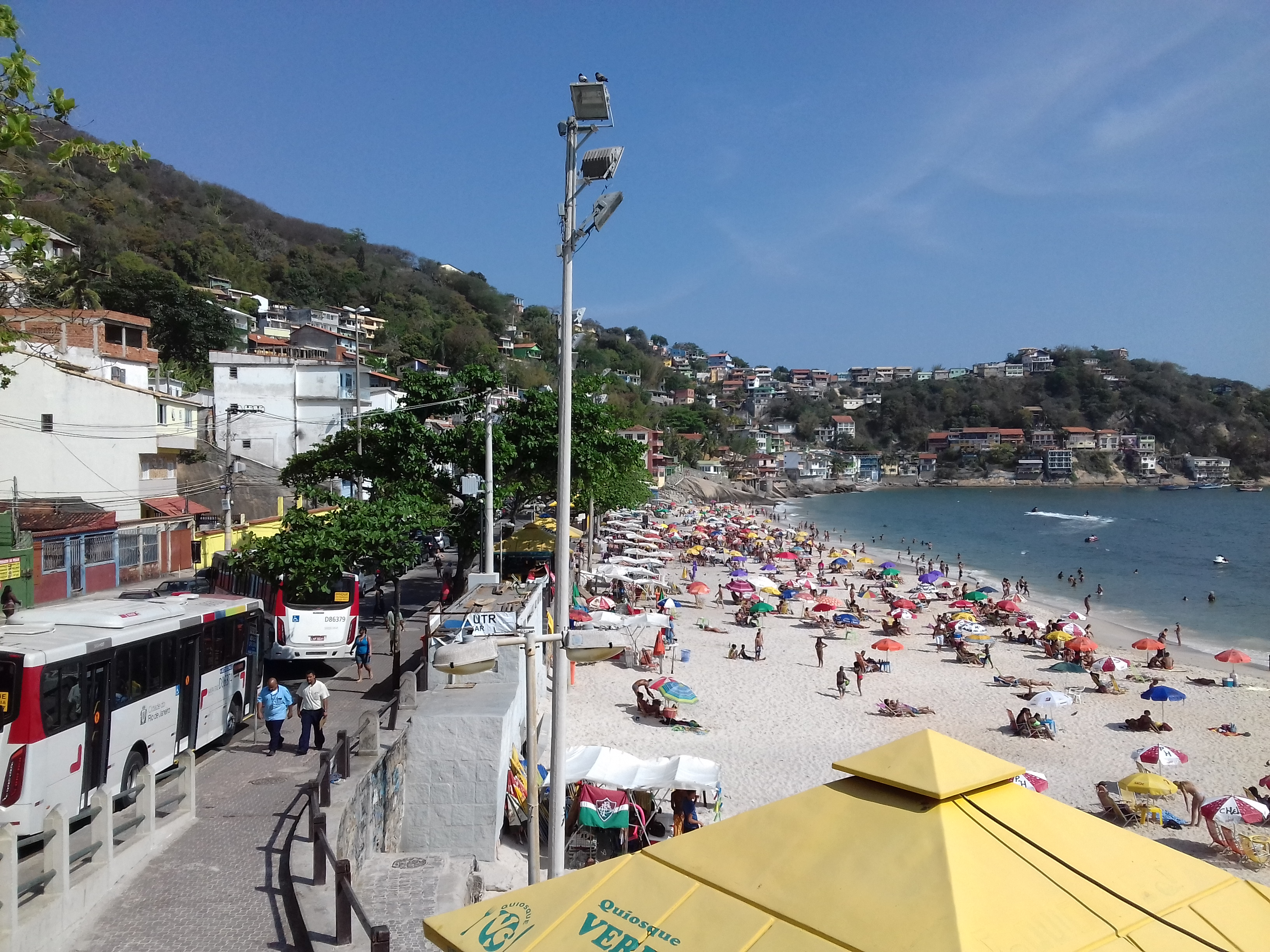
Barra de Guaratiba

The region expanded in 2008 due to real estate investment, anticipating easier access via the Grota Funda tunnel (pt) which was scheduled to be finished that year.
