= Reydnier Chavez =

Venezuelan ten-pin bowler

Reydnier Chavez is a Venezuelan ten-pin bowler. He finished in 22nd position of the combined rankings at the 2006 AMF World Cup.
