= Kharla Chávez =

Ecuadorian politician and lawyer

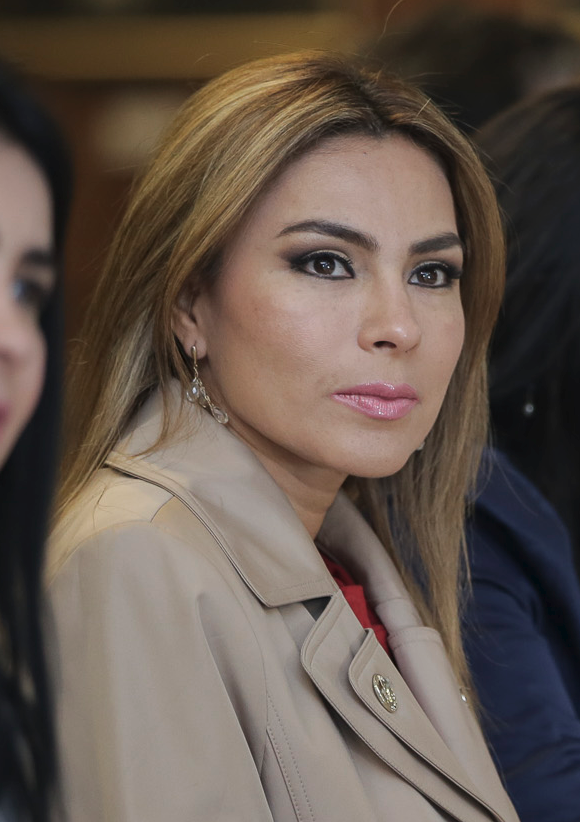
- Chávez in 2017

Member of the National Assembly of Ecuador for Los Ríos Province
- In office 2017–2021

Governor of Los Ríos Province
- In office 2015–2016

Mayor of Babahoyo
- In office 2009–2014

Personal details
- Born: March 19, 1975 (age 51) Babahoyo, Ecuador
- Party: PAIS Alliance

Kharla del Rocío Chávez Bajaña (born March 19, 1975) is an Ecuadorian politician and lawyer who served as the first woman mayor of the city of Babahoyo from 2009 to 2014.

== Career ==
Chávez was born on March 19, 1975, in the city of Babahoyo. In 1992, she was elected as the beauty queen of her home city. Chávez began her political career ten years later when she was elected councillor of the city of Babahoyo by the Social Christian Party. She later distanced herself from the party leadership and thus sought to be re-elected in 2006 with the Ecuadorian Roldosist Party. After receiving an invitation to participate in the mayoral elections for Babahoyo by the pro-government movement PAIS Alliance in 2008, Chávez resigned her role as a councillor. In the Ecuadorian municipal elections held the following year, she became the first woman to be elected mayor of that city after achieving the minimum lead of 230 votes over conservative then-mayor Johnny Terán.

During Chávez's time in the mayor's office, she oversaw the construction of a land terminal in the city, the Eugenio Espejo replica school and new access bridges in the Barreiro parish. She personally managed the construction of a shopping mall chain called El Paseo Shopping. In March 2015, Chávez was appointed governor of the Los Ríos Province by the president Rafael Correa. In the 2017 Ecuadorian legislative elections, she was elected a national assemblyman by PAIS Alliance and represents the party in the Los Ríos Province. At the beginning of Chávez's term in the assembly, she was named vice-president of the Commission on Oversight and Political Control.
