= Frank Chavez (union official) =

Teamsters union official and close ally of Jimmy Hoffa

- Died: 16 August 1967; San Juan, Puerto Rico
- Occupations: Union official, mobster
- Allegiance: Teamsters
- Criminal charges: Obstruction of Justice (1963, mistrial)

Frank Chavez was a Teamsters union official and close ally of Jimmy Hoffa.

== Biography ==
Chavez's recruitment into the Teamsters occurred under unusual circumstances. He first came to Hoffa's attention when he drove a truck through a Teamsters picket line, the audacity of which impressed Hoffa, who stated "anyone who would do that should be working for the Teamsters, not against us". After a meeting with Chavez in Washington, Hoffa decided to send Chavez down to Puerto Rico to set up a local there. Local 901 was established with Chavez becoming its Secretary-Treasurer. In early 1962 Chavez began feuding with the Hotel Restaurant and Workers Union. In February of that year the San Juan headquarters of the union was firebombed. Chavez was never charged but authorities were confident he was responsible. Subsequently the Teamsters successfully took over unionizing in the industry.

Chavez was highly thought of by Hoffa. At Teamster conventions he stayed in Hoffa's hotel suite, working as his bodyguard and gatekeeper. At the hotels Chavez would pick out the most costly perfume and clothes to give to his girlfriends, charging them to Hoffa's account. Hoffa was aware of this but tolerated it because of his capabilities and loyalty.

Chavez was investigated by the FBI for potential violations of the Foreign Agents Registration Act because of his relationship with Dominican dictator Rafael Trujillo's aide and former intelligence head General Arturo Espaillat. After Trujillo's assassination in 1961 he conspired with Trujillo's brothers Héctor and José Arismendi to organize a coup against President Joaquín Balaguer. In March 1962 Chavez told the FBI that he was approached by former Cuban president Carlos Prío Socarrás, who was attempting to get Hoffa to help him land a few hundred men on an island off Cuba and begin shelling the mainland. Chavez said he refused to introduce him to Hoffa and that Hoffa had no interest in meeting. Chavez was reportedly acquainted with Jack Ruby, later infamous for shooting Lee Harvey Oswald. His former aide Leopoldo Ramos Ducos told the FBI that he heard Chavez mention Ruby's name as someone who had a connection to the Teamsters union. He also stated that around September 1961 Chavez had a meeting with Teamsters official Richard Kavner, Jack Ruby, and a man who he said he could not recall but which the FBI believed was Tony Provenzano.

On 19 March 1963 he was indicted for obstruction of justice after he was caught handing out literature to grand jurors. At Hoffa's request, mob lawyer Frank Ragano travelled to San Juan to represent him. Ragano asked for Chavez's trial, set for 14 October, be delayed because he was representing Hoffa in Nashville on the same date. The plea was denied on the grounds that Ragano was not an attorney of record in Nashville and did not participate in the pretrial motions. Chavez got off on a mistrial when the jury failed to reach a verdict.

Like others within organized crime and the Teamsters union, Chavez had particular contempt for McClellan Committee Chief Counsel, and later Attorney General, Bobby Kennedy. After the assassination of John F. Kennedy, Chavez wrote a letter to Bobby taunting him that "the undersigned is going to solicit from the membership of our union that each one donate whatever they can afford to maintain, clean, beautify and supply with flowers the grave of Lee Harvey Oswald. You can rest assured contributions will be unanimous". He was in Hoffa's company in court during his 1963 jury tampering trial, which led to his eventual conviction. Chavez was infuriated when Hoffa's last appeal in his jury tampering case was denied. On the same day, 1 March 1967, Chavez and two associates boarded a plane to Washington while armed, intending to shoot Kennedy. Kennedy was made aware and given armed guards, while his home Hickory Hill was put under surveillance. However Chavez was talked out of it by Hoffa, worried he would never be let out of prison if Kennedy was shot, who confiscated his gun. The FBI had been made aware of the threat and it was taken seriously. Kennedy's press secretary Frank Mankiewicz recalls that the FBI provided pictures of Chavez and his associates so that if they came near Kennedy's office they could be recognized. Meanwhile DC Police had Chavez and his associates under twenty four hour surveillance.

On 16 August 1967 Chavez was shot dead in his office by his former bodyguard Ivon Coll Figueroa. When he heard the news Hoffa dispatched an aide to Puerto Rico to "take care of the Chavez family". The exact circumstances of Chavez' shooting are unclear. Tom Kennelly who worked under Bobby Kennedy in the Justice Department told journalist Dan E. Moldea that "His bodyguard just pulled out a gun and nailed him one day during an apparent argument. No one seemed to know what it was about".
