= Zanine Caldas =

Brazilian architect

- Born: April 25, 1919; Belmonte, Bahia, Brazil
- Died: December 20, 2001 (aged 82); Vitória, Espírito Santo, Brazil
- Other name: Mestre da Madeira
- Occupation: Architect

José Zanine Caldas (April 25, 1919 – December 20, 2001) was a Brazilian self-taught architect, landscaper, sculptor, and furniture designer. His works, which drew the admiration of fellow architects Oscar Niemeyer and Lucio Costa, are a unique synthesis of traditional handicraft and modern techniques.
