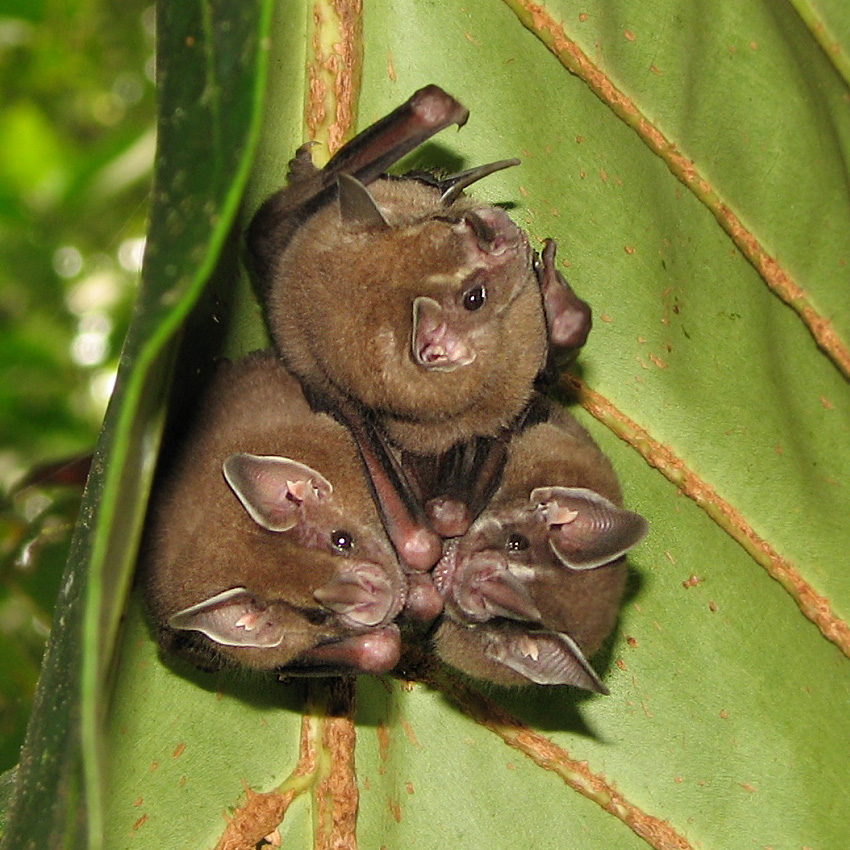
- Artibeus sp., Tortuguero National Park, Costa Rica

Scientific classification
- Kingdom: Animalia
- Phylum: Chordata
- Class: Mammalia
- Order: Chiroptera
- Family: Phyllostomidae
- Subfamily: Stenodermatinae; Gervais, 1856

Tribes & Genera
- Ametrida; Ardops; Ariteus; Artibeus; Centurio; Chiroderma †Cubanycteris; Ectophylla; Mesophylla; Phyllops; Platyrrhinus; Pygoderma; Sphaeronycteris; Stenoderma; Sturnira; Uroderma; Vampyressa; Vampyrodes

= Stenodermatinae =

Subfamily of bats

Stenodermatinae is a large subfamily of bats in the family Phyllostomidae.

== List of species ==
Subfamily Stenodermatinae

Tribe Stenodermatini

- Genus: Ametrida
  - Little white-shouldered bat, Ametrida centurio
- Genus: Ardops
  - Tree bat, Ardops nichollsi
- Genus: Ariteus
  - Jamaican fig-eating bat, Ariteus flavescens
- Genus: Artibeus - Neotropical fruit bats
  - Subgenus: Artibeus
    - Large fruit-eating bat, Artibeus amplus
    - Fringed fruit-eating bat, Artibeus fimbriatus
    - Fraternal fruit-eating bat, Artibeus fraterculus
    - Hairy fruit-eating bat, Artibeus hirsutus
    - Honduran fruit-eating bat, Artibeus inopinatus
    - Jamaican fruit bat, Artibeus jamaicensis
    - Great fruit-eating bat, Artibeus lituratus
    - Dark fruit-eating bat, Artibeus obscurus
    - Flat-faced fruit-eating bat, Artibeus planirostris
  - Subgenus: Dermanura
    - Andersen's fruit-eating bat, Artibeus anderseni
    - Aztec fruit-eating bat, Artibeus aztecus
    - Bogota fruit-eating bat, Artibeus bogotensis
    - Gervais's fruit-eating bat, Artibeus cinereus
    - Silver fruit-eating bat, Artibeus glaucus
    - Gnome fruit-eating bat, Artibeus gnomus
    - Solitary fruit-eating bat, Artibeus incomitatus
    - Pygmy fruit-eating bat, Artibeus phaeotis
    - Rosenberg's fruit-eating bat, Artibeus rosenbergi
    - Toltec fruit-eating bat, Artibeus toltecus
    - Thomas's fruit-eating bat, Artibeus watsoni
  - Subgenus: Koopmania
    - Brown fruit-eating bat, Artibeus concolor
- Genus: Centurio
  - Wrinkle-faced bat, Centurio senex
- Genus: Chiroderma - big-eyed bats or white-lined bats
  - Brazilian big-eyed bat, Chiroderma doriae
  - Guadeloupe big-eyed bat, Chiroderma improvisum
  - Salvin's big-eyed bat, Chiroderma salvini
  - Little big-eyed bat, Chiroderma trinitatum
  - Hairy big-eyed bat, Chiroderma villosum
- Genus: Ectophylla
  - Honduran white bat, Ectophylla alba
- Genus: Enchisthenes
  - Velvety fruit-eating bat, Enchisthenes hartii
- Genus: Mesophylla
  - MacConnell's bat, Mesophylla macconnelli
- Genus: Phyllops - Falcate-winged bats
  - Cuban fig-eating bat, Phyllops falcatus
- Genus: Platyrrhinus
  - Alberico's broad-nosed bat, Platyrrhinus albericoi
  - Platyrrhinus aquilus
  - Platyrrhinus angustirostris
  - Eldorado broad-nosed bat, Platyrrhinus (Vampyrops) aurarius
  - Short-headed broad-nosed bat, Platyrrhinus (Vampyrops) brachycephalus
  - Choco broad-nosed bat, Platyrrhinus chocoensis
  - Thomas's broad-nosed bat, Platyrrhinus (Vampyrops) dorsalis
  - Platyrrhinus fusciventris
  - Heller's broad-nosed bat, Platyrrhinus (Vampyrops) helleri
  - Platyrrhinus incarum
  - Buffy broad-nosed bat, Platyrrhinus (Vampyrops) infuscus
  - Ismael's broad-nosed bat, Platyrrhinus ismaeli
  - White-lined broad-nosed bat, Platyrrhinus (Vampyrops) lineatus
  - Quechua broad-nosed bat, Platyrrhinus masu
  - Matapalo broad-nosed bat, Platyrrhinus matapalensis
  - Geoffroy's Rayed bat, Platyrrhinus nigellus
  - Platyrrhinus nitelinea
  - Recife broad-nosed bat, Platyrrhinus (Vampyrops) recifinus
  - Shadowy broad-nosed bat, Platyrrhinus umbratus
  - Greater broad-nosed bat, Platyrrhinus (Vampyrops) vittatus
- Genus: Pygoderma
  - Ipanema bat, Pygoderma bilabiatum
- Genus: Sphaeronycteris
  - Visored bat, Sphaeronycteris toxophyllum
- Genus: Stenoderma
  - Red fruit bat, Stenoderma rufum
- Genus: Uroderma - Tent-building bats
  - Tent-making bat, Uroderma bilobatum
  - Brown tent-making bat, Uroderma magnirostrum
- Genus: Vampyressa - yellow-eared bats
  - Bidentate yellow-eared bat, Vampyressa bidens
  - Brock's yellow-eared bat, Vampyressa brocki
  - Melissa's yellow-eared bat, Vampyressa melissa
  - Striped yellow-eared bat, Vampyressa nymphaea
  - Southern little yellow-eared bat, Vampyressa pusilla
  - Northern little yellow-eared bat, Vampyressa thyone
- Genus: Vampyrodes
  - Great stripe-faced bat, Vampyrodes caraccioli

Tribe Sturnirini

- Genus: Sturnira - yellow-shouldered bats or American Epauleted bats
  - Aratathomas's yellow-shouldered bat, Sturnira aratathomasi
  - Bidentate yellow-shouldered bat, Sturnira bidens
  - Bogota yellow-shouldered bat, Sturnira bogotensis
  - Hairy yellow-shouldered bat, Sturnira erythromos
  - Chocó yellow-shouldered bat, Sturnira koopmanhilli
  - Little yellow-shouldered bat, Sturnira lilium
  - Highland yellow-shouldered bat, Sturnira ludovici
  - Louis's yellow-shouldered bat, Sturnira luisi
  - Greater yellow-shouldered bat, Sturnira magna
  - Mistratoan yellow-shouldered bat, Sturnira mistratensis
  - Talamancan yellow-shouldered bat, Sturnira mordax
  - Lesser yellow-shouldered bat, Sturnira nana
  - Tschudi's yellow-shouldered bat, Sturnira oporaphilum
  - Soriano's yellow-shouldered bat, Sturnira sorianoi
  - Thomas's yellow-shouldered bat, Sturnira thomasi
  - Tilda's yellow-shouldered bat, Sturnira tildae
