= Platyrrhinus ismaeli =

Conservation status
- Near Threatened (IUCN 3.1)

Scientific classification
- Kingdom: Animalia
- Phylum: Chordata
- Class: Mammalia
- Order: Chiroptera
- Family: Phyllostomidae
- Genus: Platyrrhinus
- Species: P. ismaeli

Binomial name
- Platyrrhinus ismaeli Velazco, 2005

Species of bat

Platyrrhinus ismaeli is a species of bat found in South America.

== Taxonomy and etymology ==
It was described as a new species in 2005 by zoologist Paul Velazco. Its description was the result of a taxonomic split in Thomas's broad-nosed bat, P. dorsalis. The holotype was collected in May 1987 near Balsas District, Peru. Phylogenetically, it belongs to the "Andean" clade of its genus. Other members of this clade are P. albericoi, P. aurarius, P. chocoensis, P. dorsalis, P. infuscus, P. masu, P. nigellus, and P. vittatus. P. masu is the sister taxa of P. ismaeli, or its closest relative.

The eponym of the species name is Ismael Ceballos Bendezú, a Peruvian mammalogist. Velazco named the species after him "in recognition of his important contributions to the study of Peruvian bats."

== Description ==
It is a medium-sized member of its genus, with a forearm length of 50–56 mm (2.0–2.2 in) and a body mass of 30–51 g (1.1–1.8 oz). The fur on its back is dark brown, and its ventral fur is grayish. It has dark facial stripes of differing sizes. It has a stripe running down the length of its spine that is lighter than its facial stripes. Its nose-leaf is longer than it is wide. Males and females are similar in appearance.

== Biology ==
Little is known about its reproduction. A pregnant female was once documented in late January, while another female with more advanced pregnancy was documented in early March. It is "basically frugivorous".

== Range and habitat ==
It has been documented on both sides of the Andes in Peru, Ecuador, and Colombia. It occurs at relatively high elevation, from 1,230–2,950 m (4,040–9,680 ft) above sea level. It is often found in montane forests.

== Conservation ==
It is currently evaluated as near-threatened by the IUCN. Its most recent assessment in 2016 was a down-listing from its 2008 assessment as vulnerable.
