= Cubanycteris =

Cubanycteris Temporal range: Late Quaternary

Scientific classification
- Domain: Eukaryota
- Kingdom: Animalia
- Phylum: Chordata
- Class: Mammalia
- Order: Chiroptera
- Family: Phyllostomidae
- Genus: †Cubanycteris
- Species: †C. silvai

Binomial name
- †Cubanycteris silvai Mancina & Garcia-Rivera, 2005

Extinct genus of bat

Cubanycteris is an extinct genus of bat containing a single species, C. silvai.

Cubanycteris belongs to the subfamily Stenodermatinae. Fossil specimens were found in a cave in Cueva Geda, Pinar del Río, Cuba.
