= Brown-bellied broad-nosed bat =

Conservation status
- Least Concern (IUCN 3.1)

Scientific classification
- Kingdom: Animalia
- Phylum: Chordata
- Class: Mammalia
- Order: Chiroptera
- Family: Phyllostomidae
- Genus: Platyrrhinus
- Species: P. fusciventris

Binomial name
- Platyrrhinus fusciventris Velazco et al., 2010
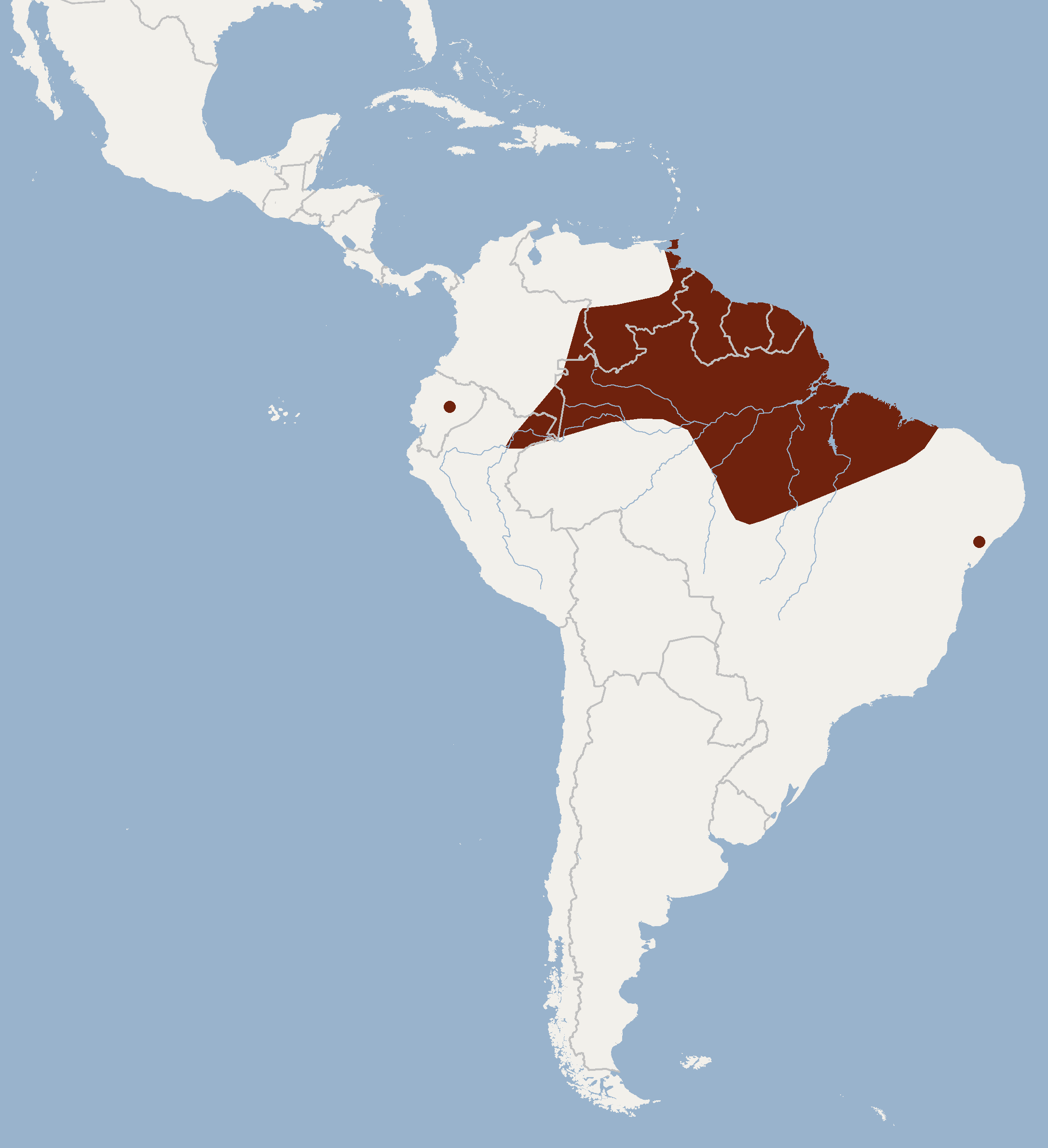

Species of bat

The brown-bellied broad-nosed bat (Platyrrhinus fusciventris) is a species of bat in the family Phyllostomidae. As a phyllostomid bat, it is characterized by a narrow uropatagium which is fringed with hair; a white dorsal stripe; large inner upper incisors convergent at the tips; and three upper and three lower molars. It is found in Guyana, Suriname, French Guiana, Trinidad and Tobago, northern Brazil, eastern Ecuador, and the southern Venezuela. It is closely related to Platyrrhinus incarum and Platyrrhinus angustirostris.
