= Slender broad-nosed bat =

Conservation status
- Least Concern (IUCN 3.1)

Scientific classification
- Kingdom: Animalia
- Phylum: Chordata
- Class: Mammalia
- Order: Chiroptera
- Family: Phyllostomidae
- Genus: Platyrrhinus
- Species: P. angustirostris

Binomial name
- Platyrrhinus angustirostris Velazco et al., 2010

Species of bat

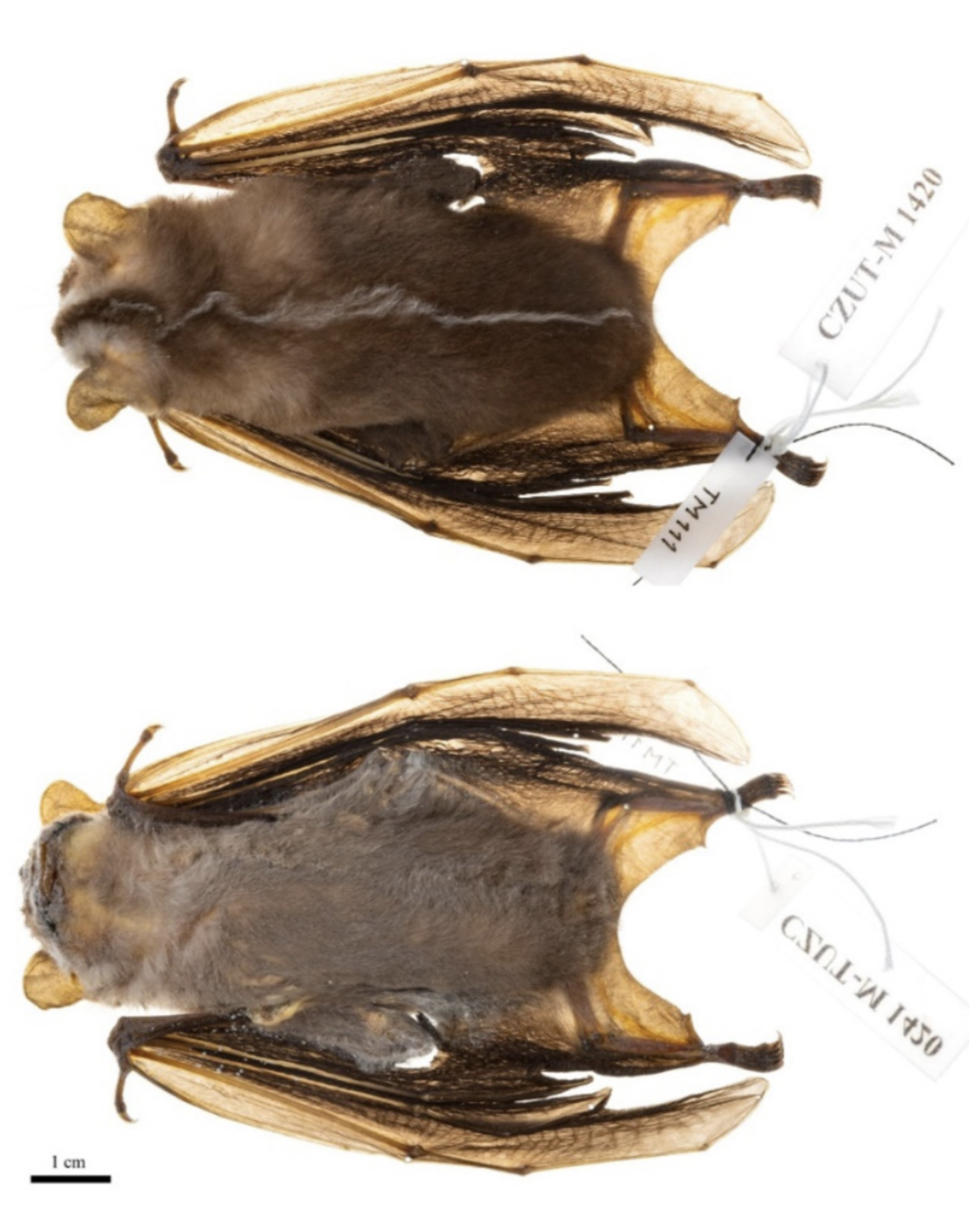
Platyrrhinus angustirostris

The slender broad-nosed bat (Platyrrhinus angustirostris) is a species of bat in the family Phyllostomidae. As a phyllostomid bat, it is characterized by a narrow uropatagium which is fringed with hair; a white dorsal stripe; large inner upper incisors convergent at the tips; and three upper and three lower molars. It is found in eastern Colombia and Ecuador, north-eastern Peru, and Venezuela. It is closely related to Platyrrhinus incarum and Platyrrhinus fusciventris.
