= Matapalo broad-nosed bat =

Conservation status
- Near Threatened (IUCN 3.1)

Scientific classification
- Kingdom: Animalia
- Phylum: Chordata
- Class: Mammalia
- Order: Chiroptera
- Family: Phyllostomidae
- Genus: Platyrrhinus
- Species: P. matapalensis

Binomial name
- Platyrrhinus matapalensis Velazco, 2005

Species of bat

The Matapalo broad-nosed bat (Platyrrhinus matapalensis) is a species of leaf-nosed bat described in 2005. It is found in South America.

== Taxonomy and etymology ==
Before it was described, there were only 10 species recognized in the genus Platyrrhinus. With the description of P. matapalensis and other species since 2005, the total is now at least 20 species. P. matapalensis was described as the result of a taxonomic split in Heller's broad-nosed bat, with the "Eastern" populations retaining the name P. helleri, and the "Western" populations described as P. matapalensis. The holotype for the species was collected in July 1954 in Zarumilla, Peru by Peruvian ornithologist Celestino Kalinowski. Its species name matapalensis is derived from the Matapalo District, where the holotype was found.

== Description ==
It is a small member of its genus, with a forearm length of 37–39 mm (1.5–1.5 in). The fur on its back is light brown, with individual hairs tricolored. Dorsal hairs are 6.3–7.5 mm (0.25–0.30 in) long. The face is striped and the fur on its belly is brownish, with individual hairs bicolored or unicolored, depending on the individual. It has a narrow dorsal stripe down the length of its spine that is the same color as its facial stripes. Its nose-leaf is longer than it is wide. The margin of the uropatagium is densely furred with a fringe of hairs.

== Range and status ==
It is known from the western slopes of the Andes in Ecuador and Peru. It may occur in northwest Colombia, though no records support this hypothesis yet. It prefers lowland forests that are undisturbed. It has been found at elevations of 50–680 m (160–2,230 ft) above sea level.

It is currently evaluated as near-threatened by the IUCN. Its habitat loss has been so dramatic that the species is close to qualifying for vulnerable status.
