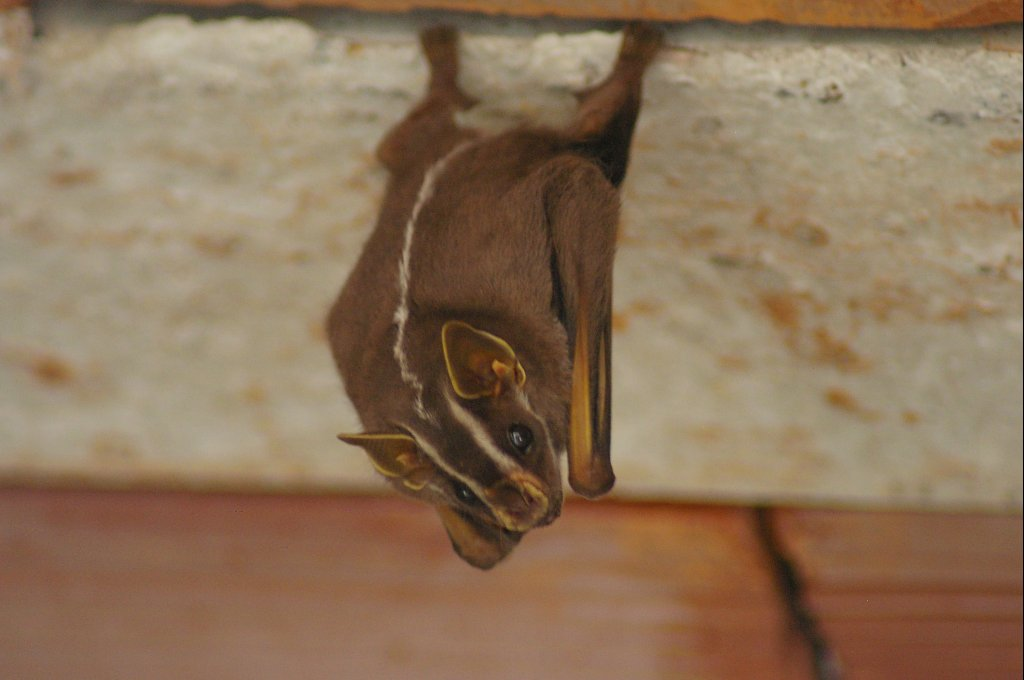
- Platyrrhinus sp.

Scientific classification
- Domain: Eukaryota
- Kingdom: Animalia
- Phylum: Chordata
- Class: Mammalia
- Order: Chiroptera
- Family: Phyllostomidae
- Subfamily: Stenodermatinae
- Genus: Platyrrhinus; Saussure, 1860

Type species
- Phyllostoma lineatum É. Geoffroy, 1810

Species
- Platyrrhinus albericoi Platyrrhinus angustirostris Platyrrhinus aquilus Platyrrhinus aurarius Platyrrhinus brachycephalus Platyrrhinus chocoensis Platyrrhinus dorsalis Platyrrhinus fusciventris Platyrrhinus guianensis Platyrrhinus helleri Platyrrhinus incarum Platyrrhinus infuscus Platyrrhinus ismaeli Platyrrhinus lineatus Platyrrhinus masu Platyrrhinus matapalensis Platyrrhinus nigellus Platyrrhinus nitelinea Platyrrhinus recifinus Platyrrhinus umbratus Platyrrhinus vittatus

Synonyms
- Vampyrops Peters, 1865

= Platyrrhinus =

Genus of bats

Platyrrhinus is a genus of leaf-nosed bats in the tribe Stenodermatini of family Phyllostomidae. Twenty-one species are known:

- Alberico's broad-nosed bat, Platyrrhinus albericoi
- Slender broad-nosed bat, Platyrrhinus angustirostris
- Darien broad-nosed bat, Platyrrhinus aquilus
- Eldorado broad-nosed bat, Platyrrhinus aurarius
- Short-headed broad-nosed bat, Platyrrhinus brachycephalus
- Choco broad-nosed bat, Platyrrhinus chocoensis
- Thomas's broad-nosed bat, Platyrrhinus dorsalis
- Brown-bellied broad-nosed bat, Platyrrhinus fusciventris
- Guianan broad-nosed bat, Platyrrhinus guianensis
- Heller's broad-nosed bat, Platyrrhinus helleri
- Incan broad-nosed bat, Platyrrhinus incarum
- Buffy broad-nosed bat, Platyrrhinus infuscus
- Platyrrhinus ismaeli
- White-lined broad-nosed bat, Platyrrhinus lineatus
- Quechua broad-nosed bat, Platyrrhinus masu
- Matapalo broad-nosed bat, Platyrrhinus matapalensis
- Geoffroy's rayed bat, Platyrrhinus nigellus
- Western broad-nosed bat, Platyrrhinus nitelinea
- Recife broad-nosed bat, Platyrrhinus recifinus
- Shadowy broad-nosed bat, Platyrrhinus umbratus
- Greater broad-nosed bat, Platyrrhinus vittatus
