= Mistratoan yellow-shouldered bat =

Conservation status
- Data Deficient (IUCN 3.1)

Scientific classification
- Kingdom: Animalia
- Phylum: Chordata
- Class: Mammalia
- Order: Chiroptera
- Family: Phyllostomidae
- Genus: Sturnira
- Species: S. mistratensis

Binomial name
- Sturnira mistratensis Vega and Cadena, 2000
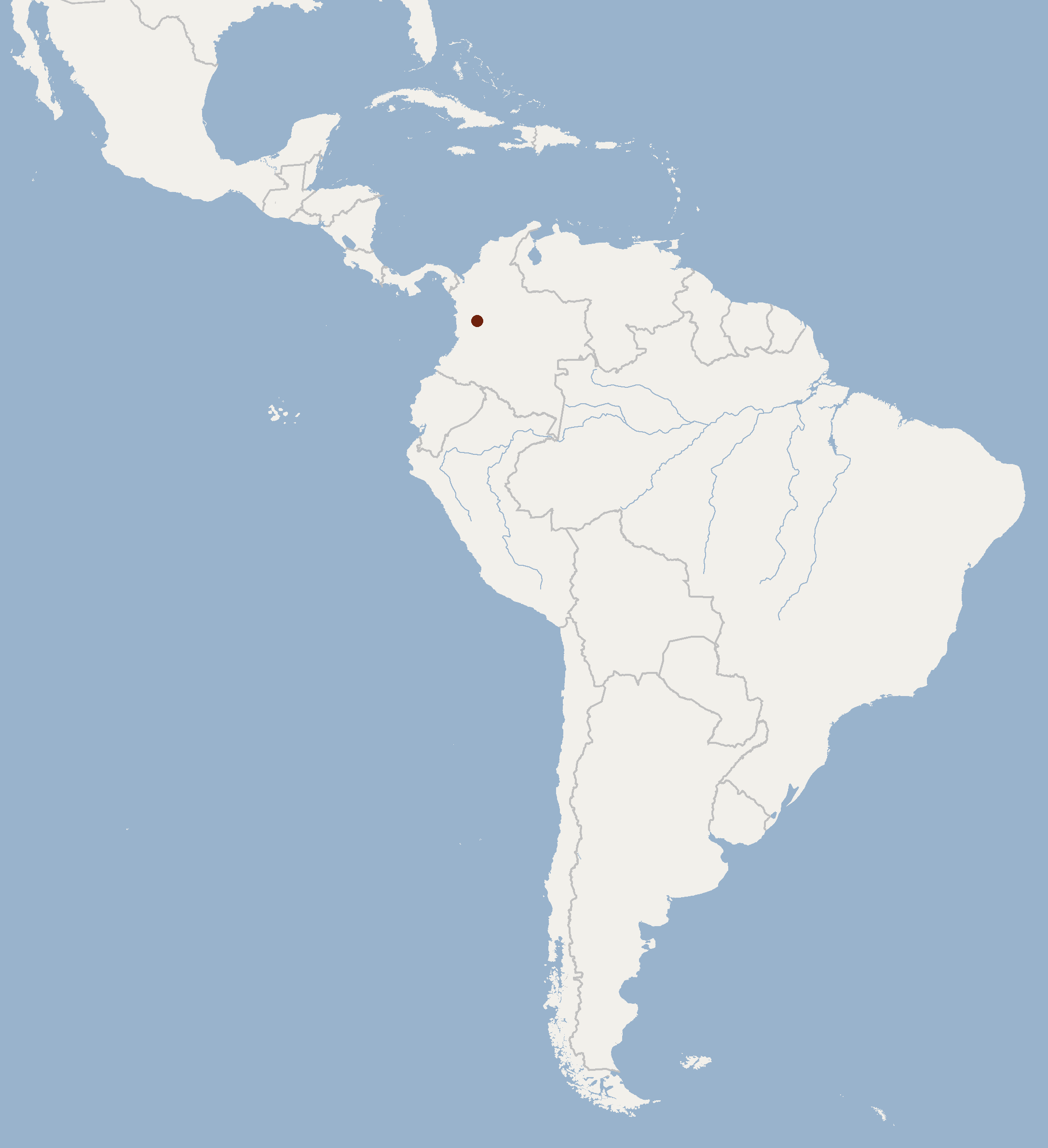

Species of bat

The Mistratoan yellow-shouldered bat (Sturnira mistratensis), is a species of leaf-nosed bat indigenous to the Cordillera Occidental, in the Mistrato municipality in Risaralda, Colombia. Since existing information derives exclusively from the holotype, the status of the species, its environmental requirements, and the trend of the population are unknown.

== See also ==
- List of mammals of Colombia
