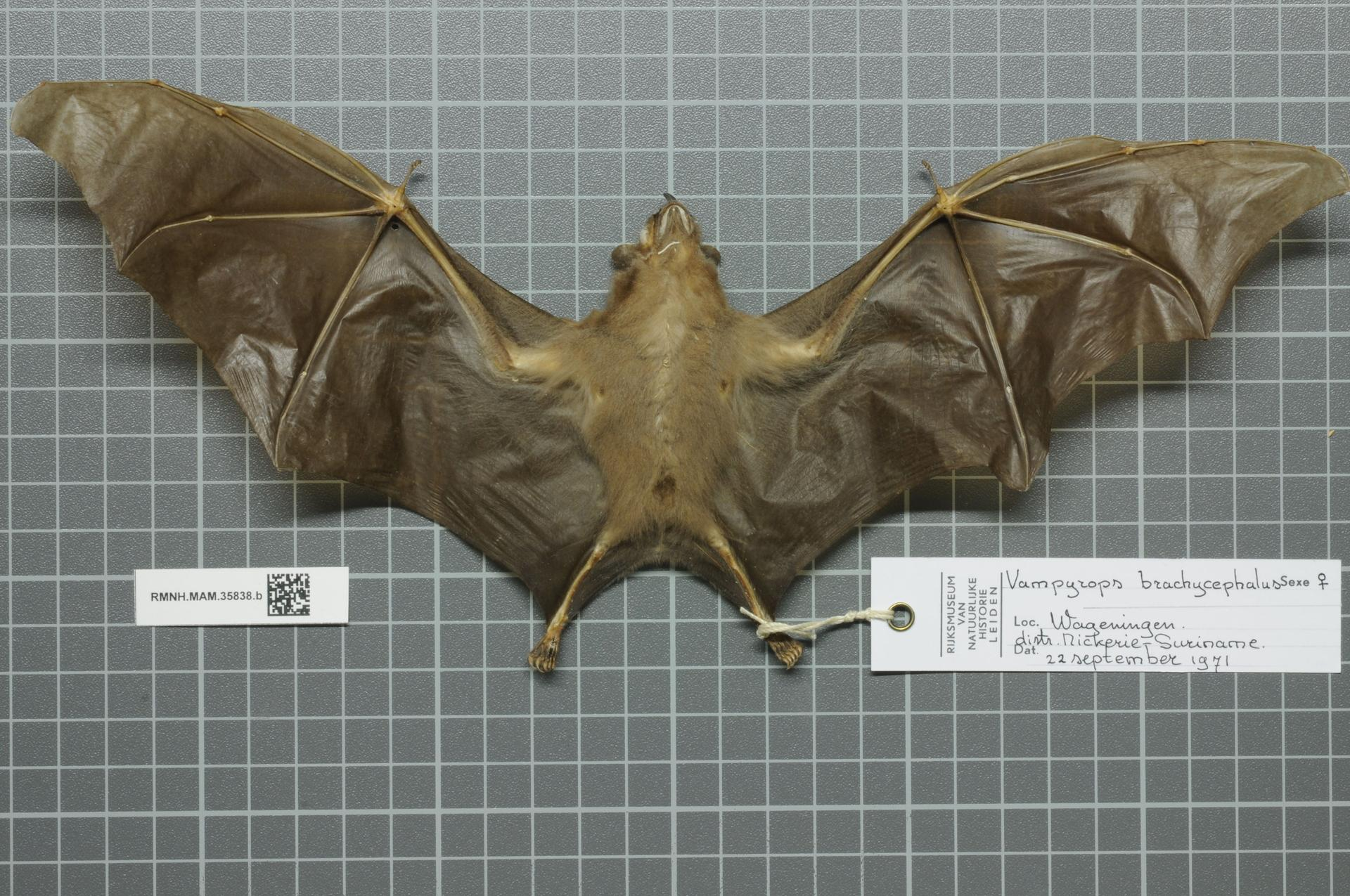

Conservation status
- Least Concern (IUCN 3.1)

Scientific classification
- Kingdom: Animalia
- Phylum: Chordata
- Class: Mammalia
- Order: Chiroptera
- Family: Phyllostomidae
- Genus: Platyrrhinus
- Species: P. brachycephalus

Binomial name
- Platyrrhinus brachycephalus Rouk & Carter, 1972

= Short-headed broad-nosed bat =

Species of bat

The short-headed broad-nosed bat (Platyrrhinus brachycephalus) is a bat species found in Bolivia, northwestern Brazil, Colombia, Ecuador, French Guiana, Guyana, Peru, Suriname and Venezuela.
