= Shadowy broad-nosed bat =

Conservation status
- Data Deficient (IUCN 3.1)

Scientific classification
- Kingdom: Animalia
- Phylum: Chordata
- Class: Mammalia
- Order: Chiroptera
- Family: Phyllostomidae
- Genus: Platyrrhinus
- Species: P. umbratus

Binomial name
- Platyrrhinus umbratus (Lyon, 1902)
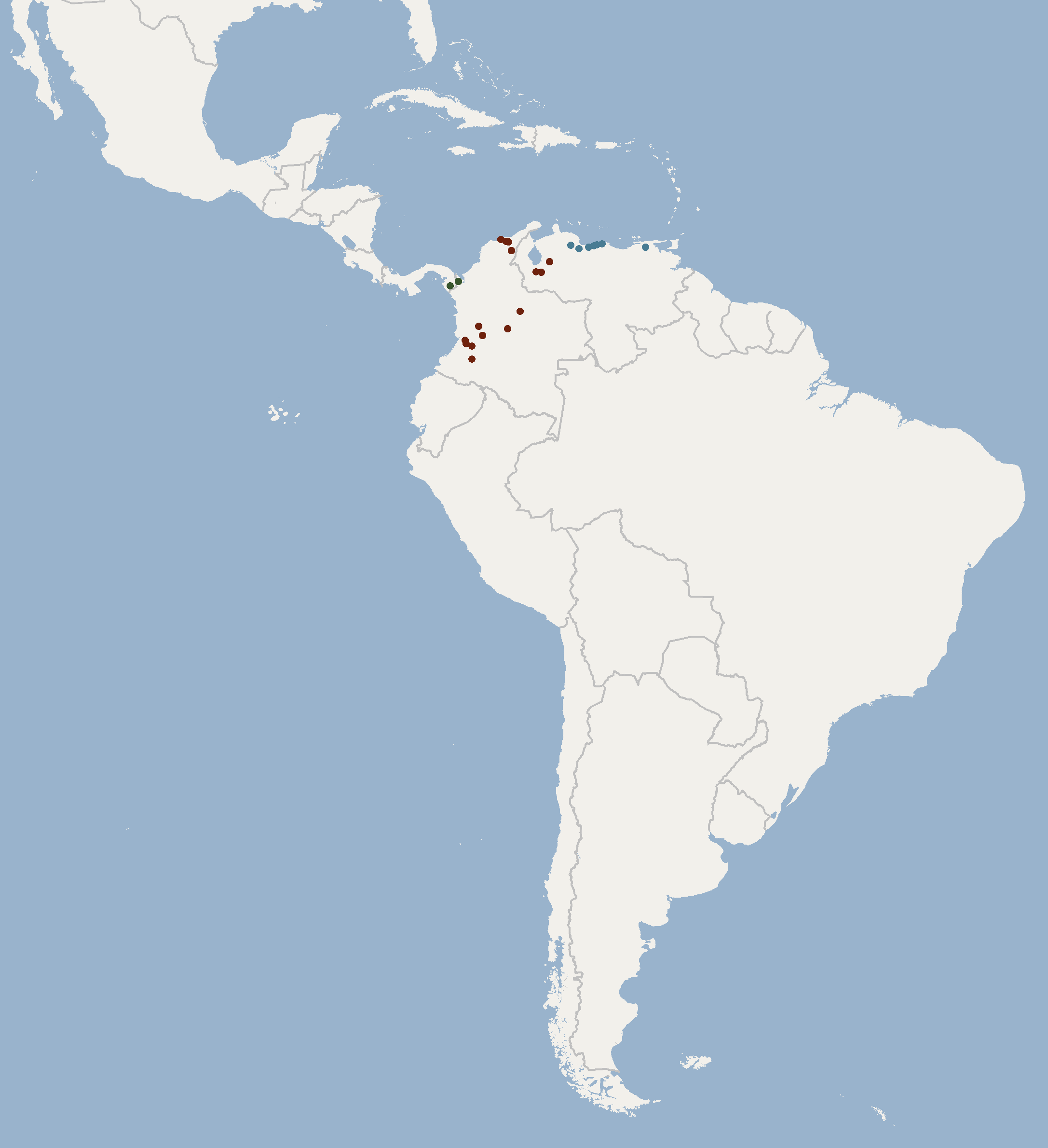

Species of bat

The shadowy broad-nosed bat (Platyrrhinus umbratus) is a species of bat in the family Phyllostomidae. It is found in Colombia and Venezuela.
