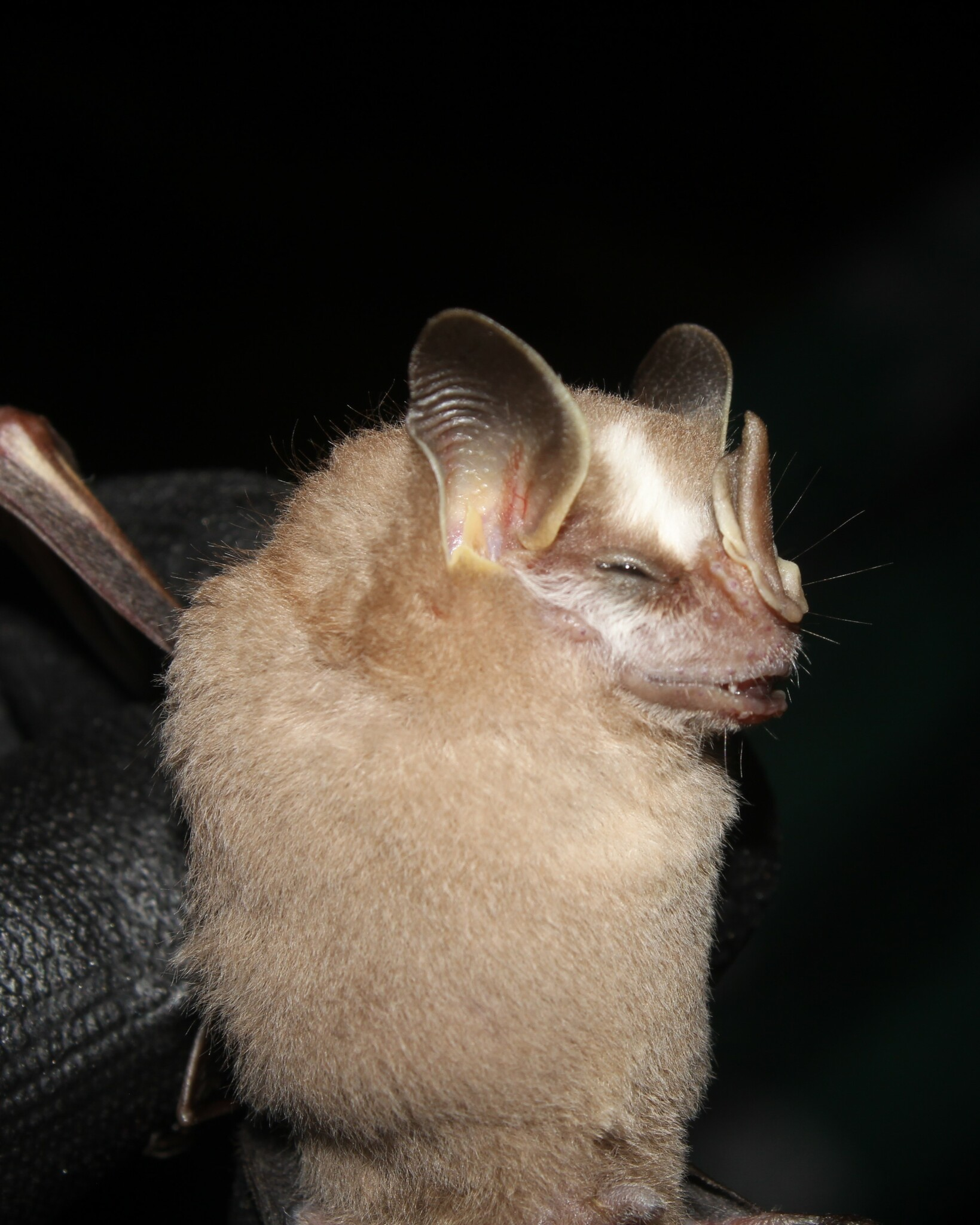

Conservation status
- Least Concern (IUCN 3.1)

Scientific classification
- Kingdom: Animalia
- Phylum: Chordata
- Class: Mammalia
- Order: Chiroptera
- Family: Phyllostomidae
- Genus: Vampyriscus
- Species: V. brocki

Binomial name
- Vampyriscus brocki Peterson, 1968

Synonyms
- Vampyressa brocki

= Brock's yellow-eared bat =

Species of bat

Brock's yellow-eared bat (Vampyriscus brocki) is a species of bat in the family Phyllostomidae, the leaf-nosed bats. It is native to Brazil, Colombia, Guyana, Suriname, French Guiana, and Peru.

This bat lives in evergreen forest. It eats mostly fruit. It breeds during the rainy season.
