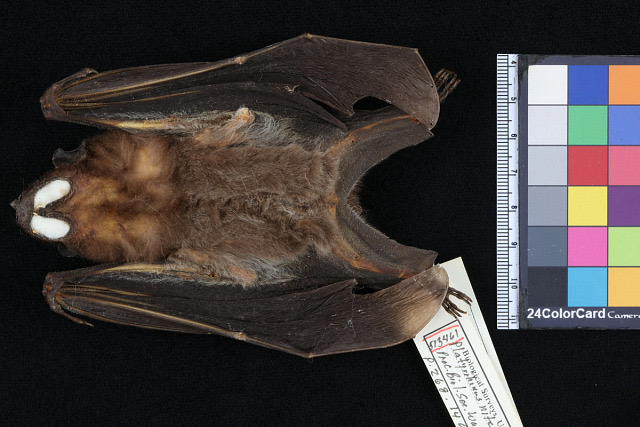
- Platyrrhinus nitelinea

Conservation status
- Data Deficient (IUCN 3.1)

Scientific classification
- Kingdom: Animalia
- Phylum: Chordata
- Class: Mammalia
- Order: Chiroptera
- Family: Phyllostomidae
- Genus: Platyrrhinus
- Species: P. nitelinea

Binomial name
- Platyrrhinus nitelinea Velazco & Gardner, 2009

= Western broad-nosed bat =

Species of bat

The western broad-nosed bat (Platyrrhinus nitelinea) is a species of bat in the family Phyllostomidae. It is found in Colombia and Ecuador.
