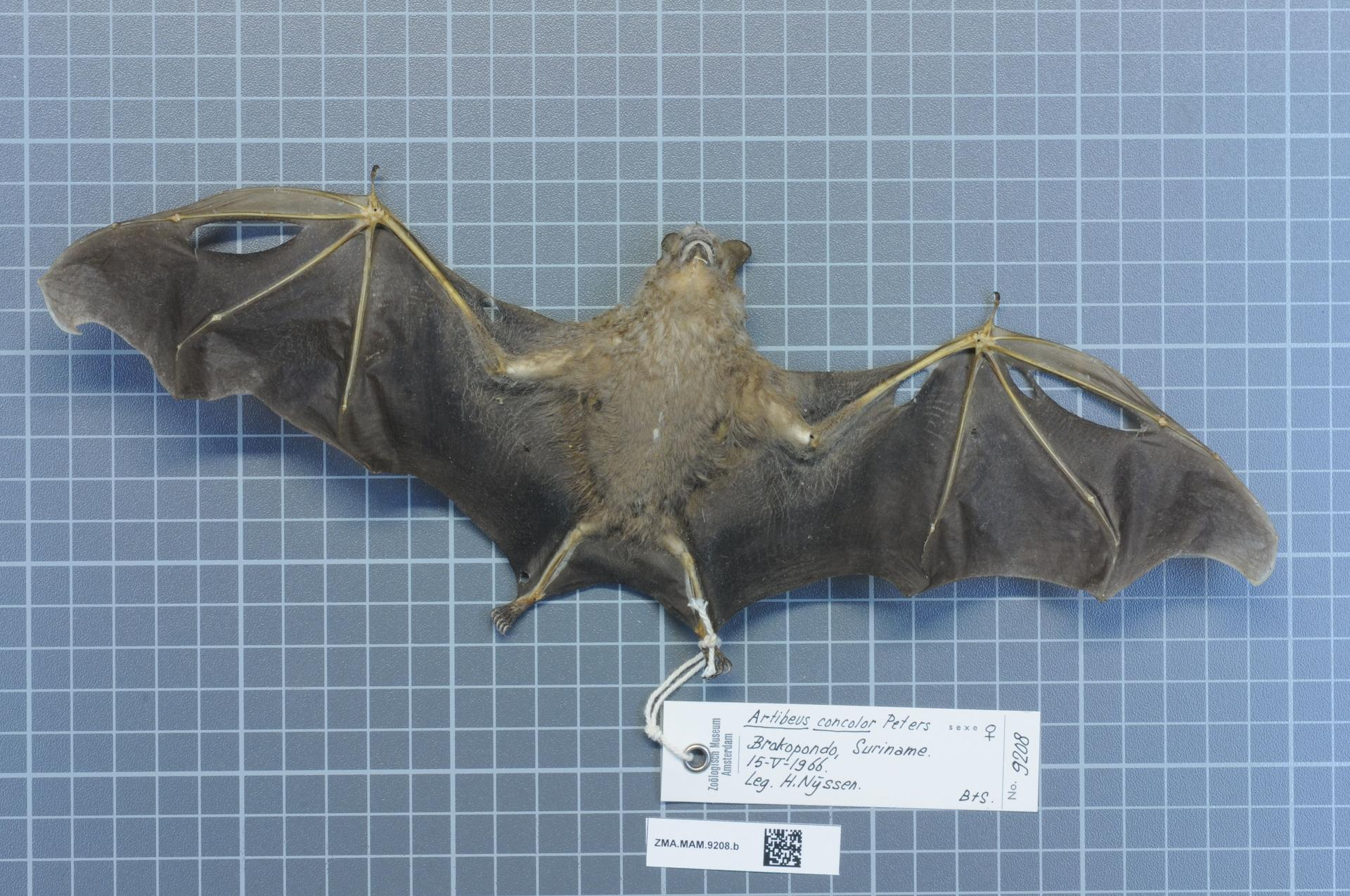

Conservation status
- Least Concern (IUCN 3.1)

Scientific classification
- Kingdom: Animalia
- Phylum: Chordata
- Class: Mammalia
- Order: Chiroptera
- Family: Phyllostomidae
- Genus: Artibeus
- Species: A. concolor

Binomial name
- Artibeus concolor Peters, 1865
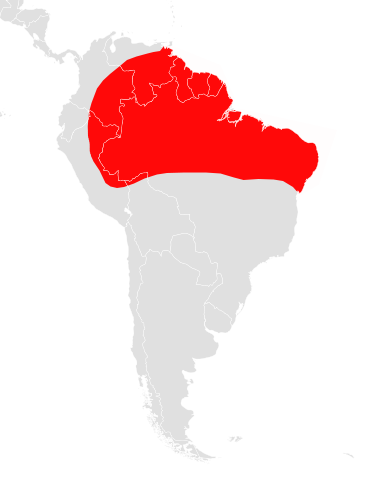
- Brown fruit-eating bat range

= Brown fruit-eating bat =

Species of bat

The brown fruit-eating bat (Artibeus concolor) is a species of bat found in Brazil, Colombia, Ecuador, French Guiana, Guyana, Peru, Suriname and Venezuela.
