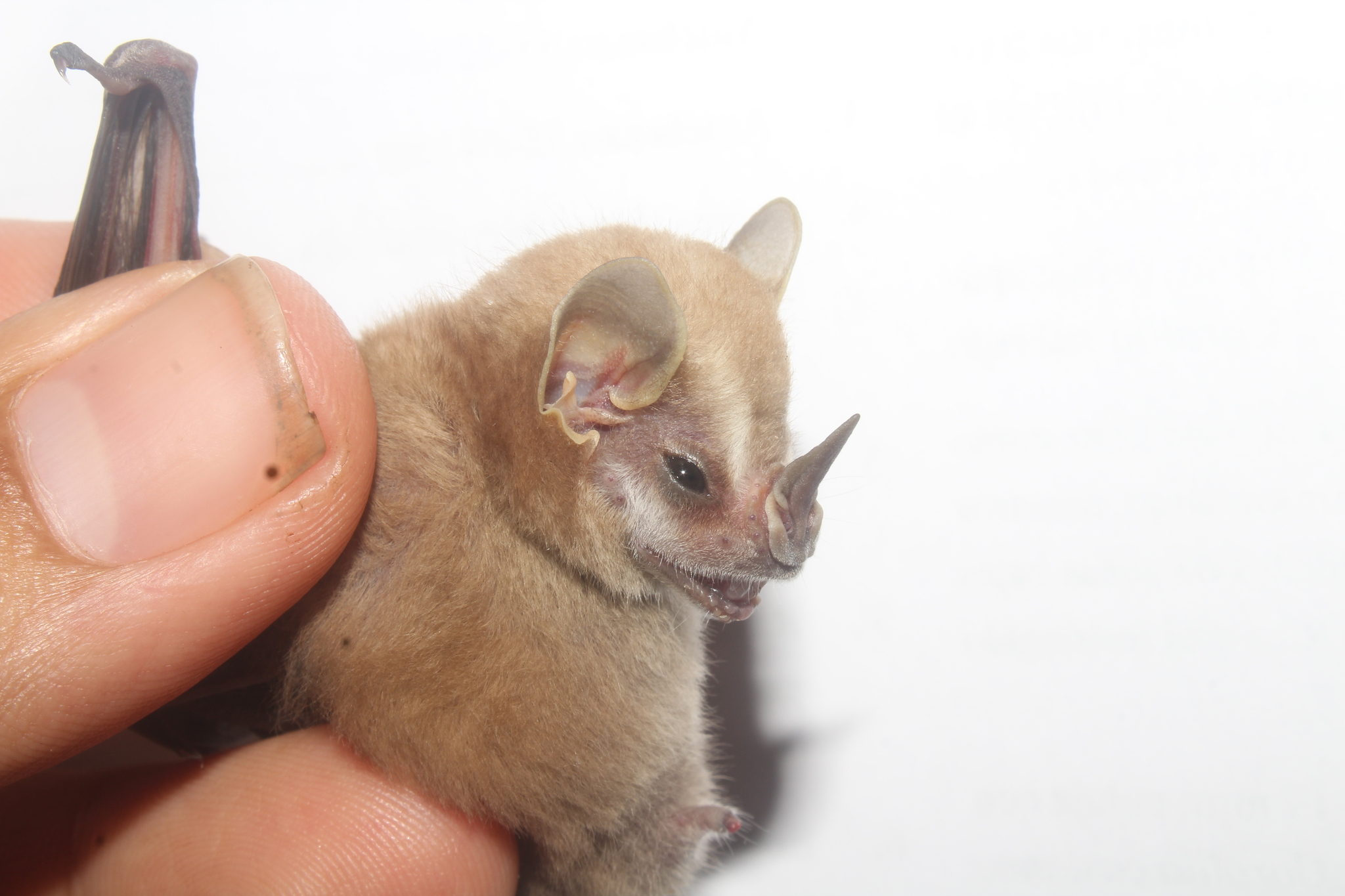

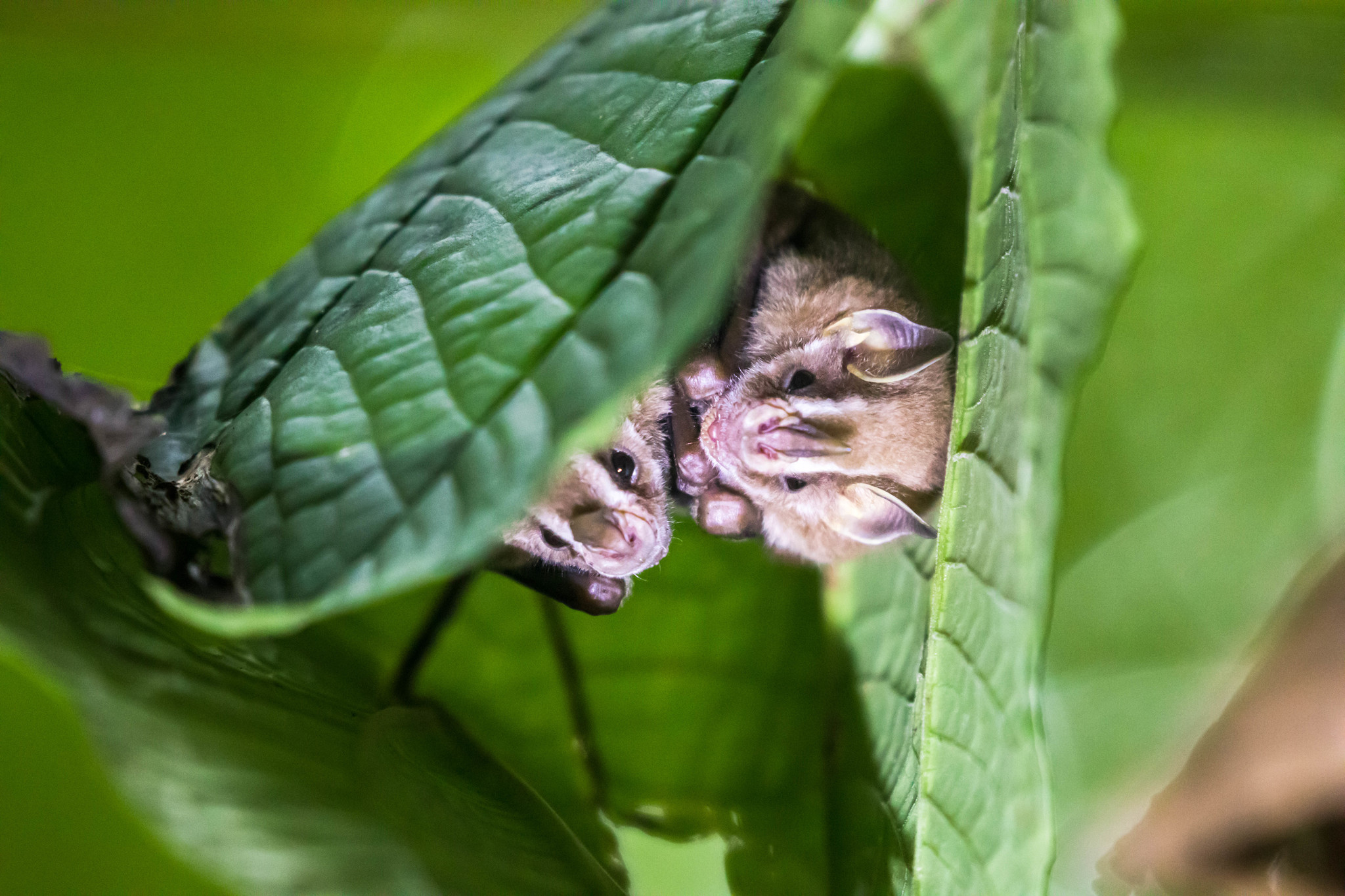

Conservation status
- Least Concern (IUCN 3.1)

Scientific classification
- Kingdom: Animalia
- Phylum: Chordata
- Class: Mammalia
- Order: Chiroptera
- Family: Phyllostomidae
- Genus: Vampyressa
- Species: V. thyone

Binomial name
- Vampyressa thyone Thomas, 1909

= Northern little yellow-eared bat =

Species of bat

The northern little yellow-eared bat (Vampyressa thyone) is a bat species found from southern Mexico to Bolivia, the Guianas and western Brazil.
