= Aratathomas's yellow-shouldered bat =

Conservation status
- Least Concern (IUCN 3.1)

Scientific classification
- Kingdom: Animalia
- Phylum: Chordata
- Class: Mammalia
- Order: Chiroptera
- Family: Phyllostomidae
- Genus: Sturnira
- Species: S. aratathomasi

Binomial name
- Sturnira aratathomasi Peterson & Tamsitt, 1968
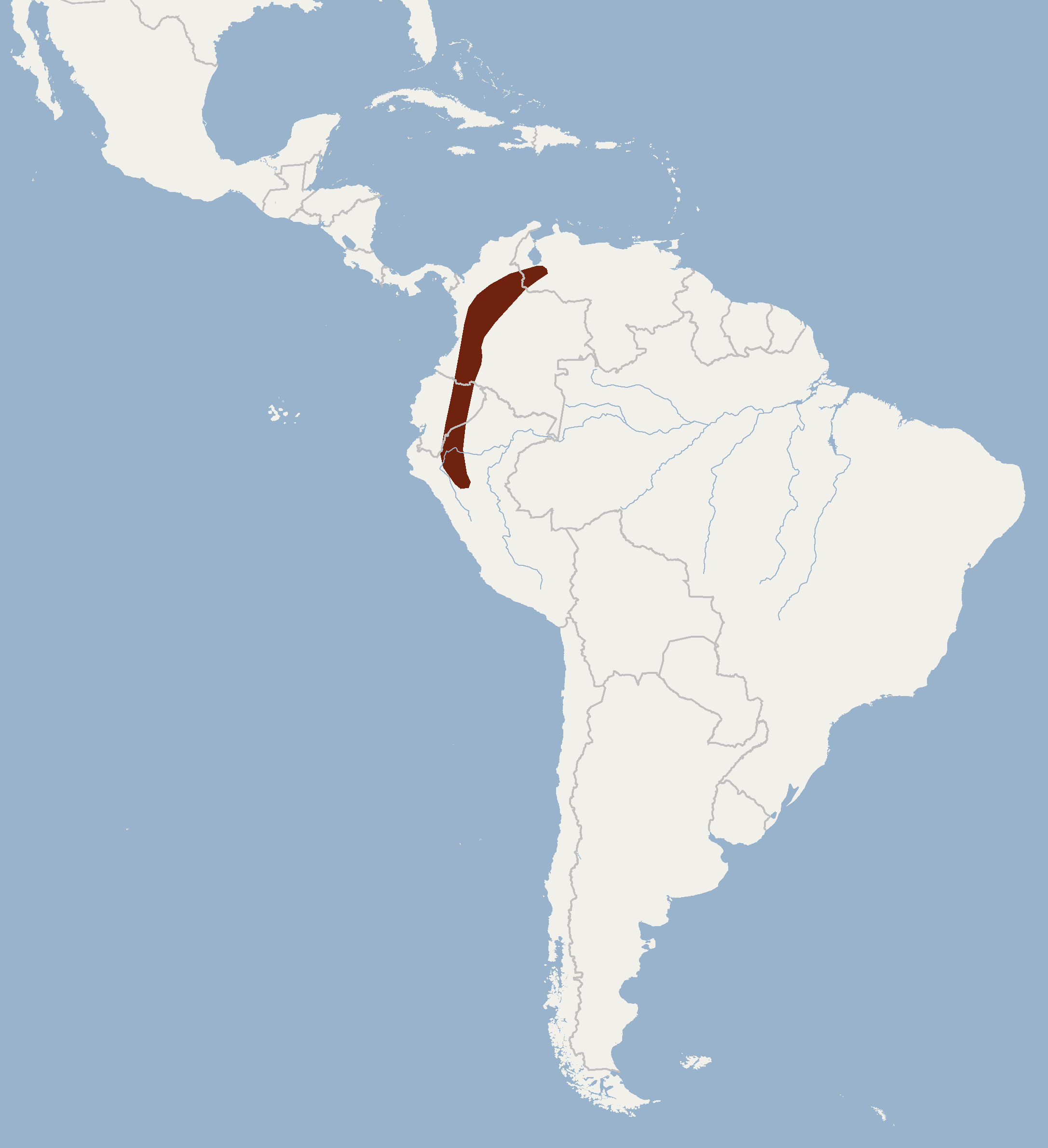

Species of bat

Aratathomas's yellow-shouldered bat (Sturnira aratathomasi) is a species of bat in the family Phyllostomidae native to South America.

== Taxonomy and etymology ==
It was described as a new species in 1968. The first documentation of the species, however, had occurred almost 100 years prior in 1874. The authors received the specimens from Andrew Arata and Maurice Thomas—the species name "aratathomasi" is a portmanteau of their respective last names.

== Description ==
In 1987, this species was called one of the largest frugivorous New World bat species, as well as the largest member of its genus (Sturnira has been expanded since then, though). Individuals weigh 46.8–53 g (1.65–1.87 oz). Its fur is dark gray in color. Its dental formula is 2.1.2.32.1.2.3 for a total of 32 teeth.

== Biology and ecology ==
Its diet likely consists of fruit, pollen, and nectar.

== Range and habitat ==
It is found in association with the Andes in Colombia, Ecuador, Peru, and Venezuela. It is found at generally high altitudes from 1,650–3,165 m (5,413–10,384 ft) above sea level.

== Conservation ==
As of 2016, it is evaluated as a least-concern species by the IUCN. It is threatened by agricultural conversion to grow opium poppies.
