= Sturnira angeli =

Conservation status
- Near Threatened (IUCN 3.1)

Scientific classification
- Kingdom: Animalia
- Phylum: Chordata
- Class: Mammalia
- Infraclass: Placentalia
- Order: Chiroptera
- Family: Phyllostomidae
- Genus: Sturnira
- Species: S. angeli

Binomial name
- Sturnira angeli de la Torre, 1966

Species of bat

Sturnira angeli, also known as the Guadeloupe yellow-shouldered bat or Angel's yellow-shouldered bat, is a species of bat in the family Phyllostomidae. It is endemic to the Lesser Antilles. As of 2018 it is listed as near threatened by the IUCN.

== Taxonomy ==
The species was previously recognized as a subspecies of S. lilium. However, it has now been elevated to a species rank.

== Description ==
The bat is uniformly grayish-brown, lacking the 'yellow-shoulder' trait of its family. Its forearm length is 44.7 mm (1.76 in).

== Biology ==
The species is frugivorous.

== Distribution and habitat ==
The species is found in the Martinique, Dominica, Guadeloupe and Montserrat islands in the Lesser Antilles. It is thought that the bat needs humid native forests to survive.

== Conservation ==
The species is listed as near-threatened, and almost meets the criteria for vulnerable (having extent of occurrence (EOO) of less than 15,504 km^{2}).The species shows no sign of continued decline in population. The species, like other island species, faces threats from natural disasters like hurricanes and volcanic eruptions. It may also face a threat from change in land cover, and agricultural use.
