= Melissa's yellow-eared bat =

Conservation status
- Vulnerable (IUCN 3.1)

Scientific classification
- Kingdom: Animalia
- Phylum: Chordata
- Class: Mammalia
- Order: Chiroptera
- Family: Phyllostomidae
- Genus: Vampyressa
- Species: V. melissa

Binomial name
- Vampyressa melissa Thomas, 1926

Species of bat

Melissa's yellow-eared bat (Vampyressa melissa) is a species of bat in the family Phyllostomidae. It is found in southern Colombia, Ecuador and Peru.
