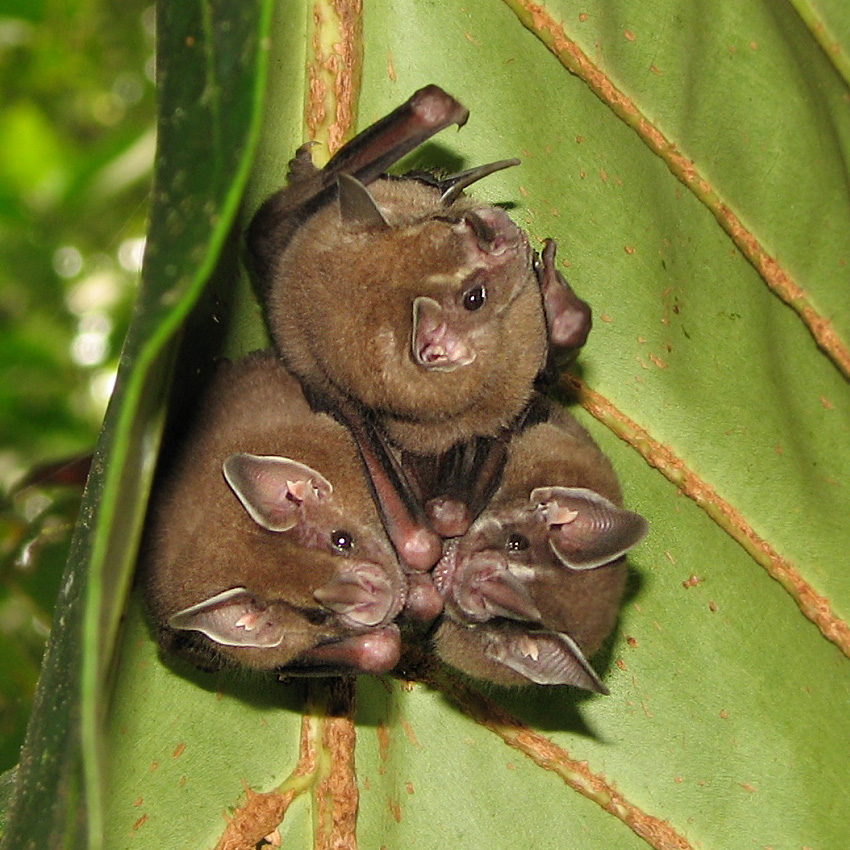
- Artibeus sp.

Scientific classification
- Kingdom: Animalia
- Phylum: Chordata
- Class: Mammalia
- Infraclass: Placentalia
- Order: Chiroptera
- Superfamily: Noctilionoidea
- Family: Phyllostomidae; Gray, 1825

Type genus
- Phyllostomus Lacépède, 1799

Subfamilies
- Carolliinae; Desmodontinae; Glossophaginae; Glyphonycterinae; Lonchophyllinae; Lonchorhininae; Macrotinae; Micronycterinae; Phyllostominae; Rhinophyllinae; Stenodermatinae
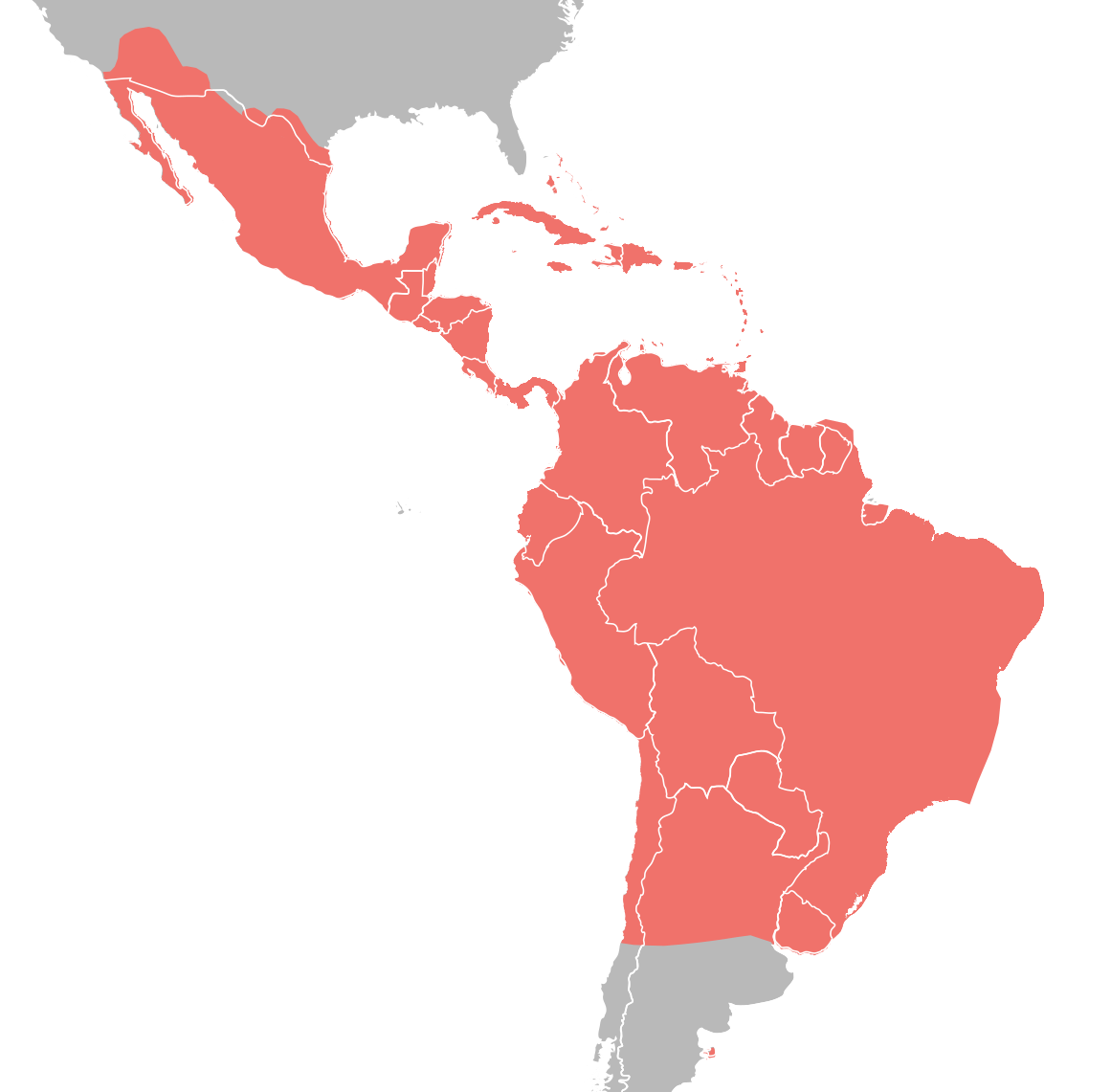
- Phyllostomidae distribution

= Leaf-nosed bat =

Leaf-nosed bats

Family of bats

The New World leaf-nosed bats (Phyllostomidae) are bats (order Chiroptera) found from southern North America to South America, specifically from the Southwest United States to northern Argentina. Both the scientific and common names derive from their often large, lance-shaped noses, though this is greatly reduced in some of the nectar- and pollen-feeders. Because these bats echolocate nasally, this "nose-leaf" is thought to serve some role in modifying and directing the echolocation call. Similar nose leaves are found in some other groups of bats, most notably the Old World leaf-nosed bats.

They are the most ecologically diverse bat family; members of this family have evolved to use food groups as varied as fruit, nectar, pollen, insects, frogs, other bats, and small vertebrates, and in the case of the vampire bats, blood. Most species are insectivorous, but the phyllostomid bats also include true predatory species and frugivores (subfamily Stenodermatinae and Carolliinae). For example, the spectral bat (Vampyrum spectrum), the largest bat in the Americas, eats vertebrate prey, including small, dove-sized birds.

== Evolution ==
The Phyllostomidae, also known as New World leaf-nosed bats, are among the most ecologically diverse mammal families. This variation is measured by diversity in skull morphology and diet-related characteristics: Phyllostomidae consists of species that have evolved physical modifications for insectivory, frugivory, hematophagy, nectarivory, and omnivory. The nose-leaf—a distinctive characteristic of the family—is thought to have evolved to reflect the dietary and foraging behavior of different species of Phyllostomidae. With an evolutionary history tracing back to the Oligocene, fossil and phylogenetic evidence suggests the family originated about 30 million years ago. Leaf nosed bats evolved from Yangochiroptera and Miniopteridae with sister groups also evolving from this group. The Phyllostomidae consists of 61 genera and about 227 species.

== Description ==
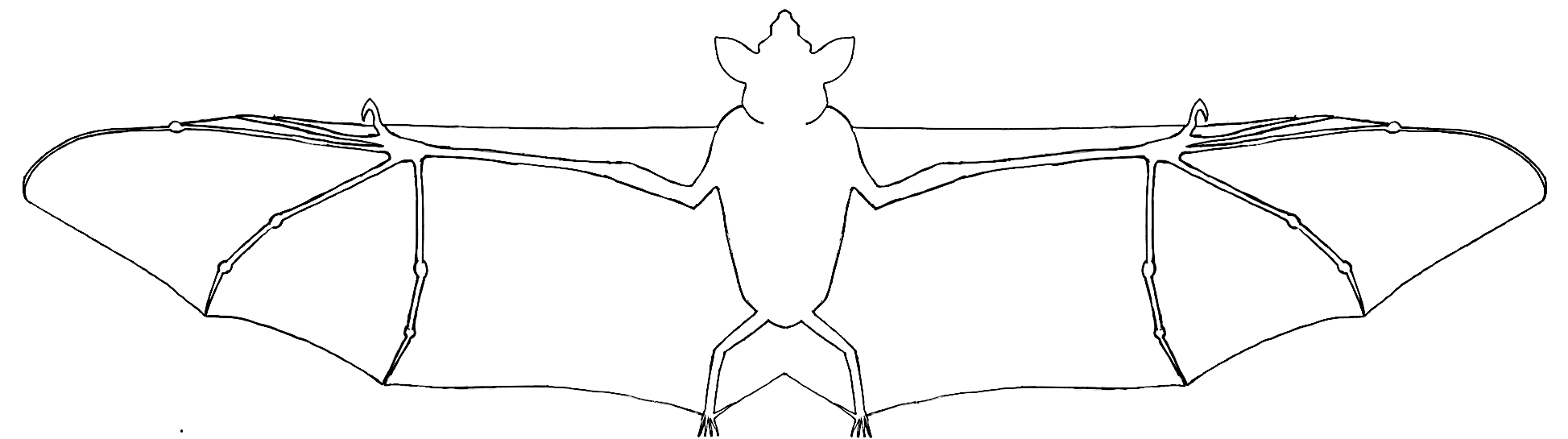
Basic leaf-nosed bat body layout

New World leaf-nosed bats are bilaterally symmetrical and endothermic mammals characterized by an elaborate outgrowth of skin on their noses, called a nose-leaf, which is believed to aid in echolocation. The nose-leaf can be adorned with a vertical leaf, a concave upward leaf, or multiple accessory leaves; varying by species. Leaf-nosed bats lack a tail, have triangular-shaped ears that can have pointed or rounded tips, range in body size from 4 to 13.5 cm (1.6 to 5.3 in), and have a wingspan of up to 90 cm (35 in) or more.

New World leaf-nosed bats are usually brown, grey, or black, although five species are white. They range in size from 4.0 to 13.5 cm (1.6 to 5.3 in) in head-body length, and can weigh from 7 to 200 g (0.25 to 7.05 oz).

== Biology and ecology ==
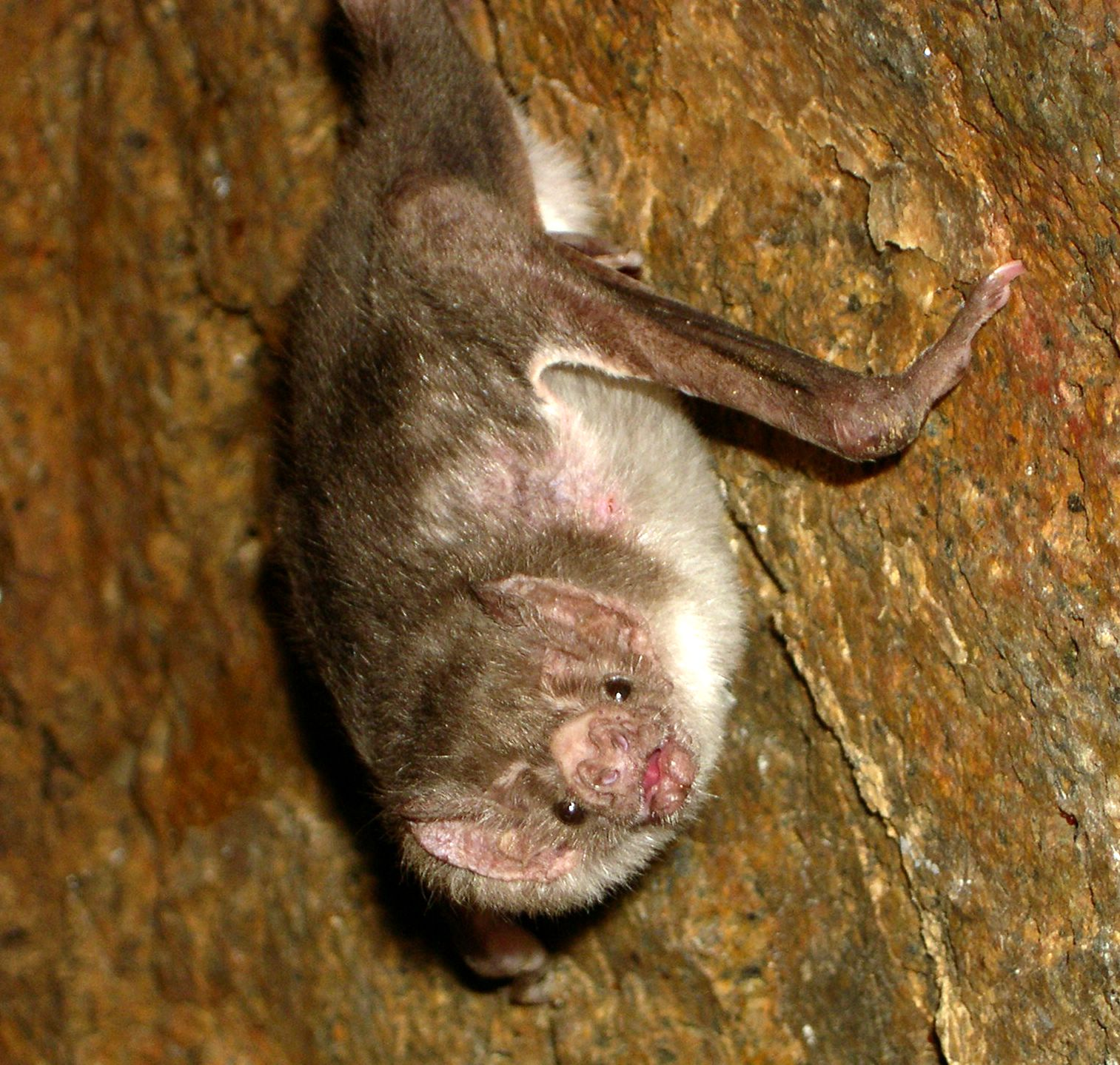
Common vampire bat (Desmodus rotundus)

Like other bats, leaf-nosed bats are nocturnal foragers that use echolocation to locate food sources, though the food sources vary between species. Many bats in the family Phyllostomidae appear to have limited reliance on echolocation, likely because frugivorous bats do not need to quickly identify flying insects like many other bats. Instead, species of leaf-nosed fruit bats appear to use scent to identify their preferred food sources.

When they are not foraging, leaf-nosed bats roost in abandoned buildings, caves, and beneath folded leaves depending on the species. Nearly every roosting option present among bats is represented within this family, including species that prefer to roost alone, as well as species that roost with thousands of other individuals every day within a large colony. They do not hibernate, although some species have been reported to aestivate.

=== Diet ===
The Phyllostomidae demonstrate the most diverse dietary habits of any family of bats across the globe. Because of this, general dietary patterns are categorized for each species. Leaf-nosed bats generally specialize in a particular type of diet which leads to classification in one of these groups: frugivore, nectarivore, insectivore, omnivore, or haematophagous. However, categorizations are based only on primary consumption habits, therefore observing species that occasionally consume food items outside of their particular classifications is not uncommon. Usually, when leaf-nosed bats consume outside of their primary dietary categorization, it is to ensure sufficient intake of nutrients that their primary food source may not provide. For example, nectar and ripe fruits provide sufficient amounts of carbohydrates and water, but are lacking in protein and fat. To meet basic nutritional requirements, leaf-nosed bats that primarily feed on fruit and nectar must also consume insects to ensure sufficient protein and fat intake and visit salt licks to acquire sodium and other nutrients.

Most leaf-nosed bats are classified as insectivores and feed on a variety of small insects. Certain species with this classification capture their prey either while in flight or from foliage in trees or on the ground. Carnivorous species feed on a variety of animals ranging from frogs to other bats. The Desmodontinae fall into this general carnivorous category, but are further distinguished by feeding exclusively on blood. In contrast, some species in this family feed on exclusively plants, gaining needed nutrients from fruits and leaves. Glossophaginae and Lonchophyllinae are nectar-feeding subfamilies.

=== Life cycle ===
Leaf-nosed bats are gonochoric (separate sexes) that partake in sexual copulation. These bats can live for 20–30 years and females become sexually active at two years of age. Female ovulation occurs from October through September, after the female mates, the gestation period ranges from 8–9 months with an initial 3- to 5-month diapause period when the fetus growth is slowed; this diapause period is controlled by hormones. The female gives birth to a single pup, which has open ears, open eyes, and the first set of deciduous teeth, and is fully furred at birth.

=== Social systems ===
Among species that roost in groups, some evidence exists for a social hierarchy with higher-ranking individuals gaining access to preferred areas of the site. Solitary roosting bats, though, live alone and maintain a strict fidelity to a single roosting site. In some cases, males live alone or with harems, while females prefer to roost with other individuals and their pups. In nearly every species that has been studied, mothers and pups maintain a social bond that lasts beyond nursing. Apparently, young bats can learn food preferences from their mothers and when they are reluctant to leave the nest, mothers literally nudge the infants out of the roost.

== Range ==
New World leaf-nosed bats range from the United States, in southern Arizona and the West Indies to northern Argentina. The family inhabits a diverse array of environments and habitats ranging from forests to deserts.

== Human impact ==
Species of New World leaf-nosed bats that make their homes in forested areas are greatly affected by agricultural intensification. Specifically, it has been found that increased agricultural activity by humans causes negative conservation effects on these habitats and as a result reduces abundance and diversity of leaf-nosed bats that live there. California leaf-nosed bats in particular are susceptible to human disruption. This species is known to create large roosts in closed mine shafts due to their potential to provide warmth and isolation. When humans enter the shafts or rework old mines, this disrupts the roosts of the leaf-nosed bats and has the potential to be detrimental to the population as a whole.

== Classification ==
FAMILY PHYLLOSTOMIDAE

- Subfamily Carolliinae
  - Genus Carollia
    - Benkeith's short-tailed bat (Carollia benkeithi)
    - Silky short-tailed bat (Carollia brevicauda)
    - Chestnut short-tailed bat (Carollia castanea)
    - Silky short-tailed bat (Carollia colombiana)
    - Manu short-tailed bat (Carollia manu)
    - Mono's short-tailed bat (Carollia monohernandezi)
    - Seba's short-tailed bat (Carollia perspicillata)
    - Sowell's short-tailed bat (Carollia sowelli)
    - Gray short-tailed bat (Carollia subrufa)
- Subfamily: Desmodontinae - vampire bats
  - Genus Desmodus
    - D. archaeodaptes, †
    - Giant vampire bat, D. draculae †,
    - Cuban vampire bat, D. puntajudensis †
    - Common vampire bat, D. rotundus
    - Stock's vampire bat, D. stocki †,
  - Genus Diaemus
    - White-winged vampire bat, D. youngi
  - Genus Diphylla
    - Hairy-legged vampire bat, D. ecaudata
- Subfamily: Glossophaginae
  - Tribe Brachyphyllini
    - Genus Brachyphylla
      - Antillean fruit-eating bat (Brachyphylla cavernarum)
      - Cuban fruit-eating bat (Brachyphylla nana)
    - Genus Erophylla
      - Brown flower bat (Erophylla bombifrons)
      - Buffy flower bat (Erophylla sezekorni)
    - Genus Phyllonycteris
      - Jamaican flower bat (Phyllonycteris aphylla)
      - Puerto Rican flower bat (Phyllonycteris major)
      - Cuban flower bat (Phyllonycteris poeyi)
  - Tribe Choeronycterini
    - Genus Anoura
      - Anoura aequatoris
      - Cadena's tailless bat (Anoura cadenai)
      - Tailed tailless bat (Anoura caudifer)
      - Handley's tailless bat (Anoura cultrata)
      - Tube-lipped nectar bat (Anoura fistulata)
      - Geoffroy's tailless bat (Anoura geoffroyi)
      - Broad-toothed tailless bat (Anoura latidens)
      - Luis Manuel's tailless bat (Anoura luismanueli)
      - Anoura peruana
    - Genus Choeroniscus
      - Godman's long-tailed bat (Choeroniscus godmani)
      - Intermediate long-tailed bat (Choeroniscus intermedius)
      - Minor long-nosed long-tongued bat (Choeroniscus minor)
      - Greater long-tailed bat (Choeroniscus periosus)
    - Genus Choeronycteris
      - Mexican long-tongued bat (Choeronycteris mexicana)
    - Genus Dryadonycteris
      - Dryadonycteris capixaba
    - Genus Hylonycteris
      - Underwood's long-tongued bat (Hylonycteris underwoodi)
    - Genus Lichonycteris
      - Pale brown long-nosed bat (Lichonycteris degener)
      - Dark long-tongued bat (Lichonycteris obscura)
    - Genus Musonycteris
      - Banana bat (Musonycteris harrisoni)
    - Genus Scleronycteris
      - Ega long-tongued bat (Scleronycteris ega)
  - Tribe Glossophagini
    - Genus Glossophaga
      - Commissaris's long-tongued bat (Glossophaga commissarisi)
      - Gray long-tongued bat (Glossophaga leachii)
      - Miller's long-tongued bat (Glossophaga longirostris)
      - Western long-tongued bat (Glossophaga morenoi)
      - Pallas's long-tongued bat (Glossophaga soricina)
    - Genus Leptonycteris
      - Southern long-nosed bat (Leptonycteris curasoae)
      - Greater long-nosed bat (Leptonycteris nivalis)
      - Lesser long-nosed bat (Leptonycteris yerbabuenae)
    - Genus Monophyllus
      - Insular single leaf bat (Monophyllus plethodon)
      - Leach's single leaf bat (Monophyllus redmani)
- Subfamily: Glyphonycterinae
  - Genus Glyphonycteris
    - Behn's bat (Glyphonycteris behnii)
    - Davies's big-eared bat (Glyphonycteris daviesi)
    - Tricolored big-eared bat (Glyphonycteris sylvestris)
  - Genus Neonycteris
    - Least big-eared bat (Neonycteris pusilla)
  - Genus Trinycteris
    - Niceforo's big-eared bat (Trinycteris nicefori)
- Subfamily Lonchophyllinae
  - Tribe Hsunycterini
    - Genus Hsunycteris
      - Cadena's long-tongued bat (Hsunycteris cadenai)
      - Dashe's nectar bat (Hsunycteris dashe)
      - Patton's long-tongued bat (Hsunycteris pattoni)
      - Thomas's nectar bat (Hsunycteris thomasi)
  - Tribe Lonchophyllini
    - Genus Lionycteris
      - Chestnut long-tongued bat (Lionycteris spurrelli)
    - Genus Lonchophylla
      - Bokermann's nectar bat (Lonchophylla bokermanni)
      - Chocoan long-tongued bat (Lonchophylla chocoana)
      - Lonchophylla concava
      - Dekeyser's nectar bat (Lonchophylla dekeyseri)
      - Lonchophylla fornicata
      - Handley's nectar bat (Lonchophylla handleyi)
      - Western nectar bat (Lonchophylla hesperia)
      - Lonchophylla inexpectata
      - Goldman's nectar bat (Lonchophylla mordax)
      - Orcés's long-tongued bat (Lonchophylla orcesi)
      - Lonchophylla orienticollina
      - Peracchi's nectar bat (Lonchophylla peracchii)
      - Orange nectar bat (Lonchophylla robusta)
    - Genus Platalina
      - Long-snouted bat (Platalina genovensium)
    - Genus Xeronycteris
      - Vieira's long-tongued bat (Xeronycteris vieirai)
- Subfamily Lonchorhininae
  - Genus Lonchorhina
    - Tomes's sword-nosed bat (Lonchorhina aurita)
    - Fernandez's sword-nosed bat (Lonchorhina fernandezi)
    - Northern sword-nosed bat (Lonchorhina inusitata)
    - Marinkelle's sword-nosed bat (Lonchorhina marinkellei)
    - Orinoco sword-nosed bat (Lonchorhina orinocensis)
- Subfamily Macrotinae
  - Genus Macrotus
    - California leaf-nosed bat (Macrotus californicus)
    - Waterhouse's leaf-nosed bat (Macrotus waterhousii)
- Subfamily Micronycterinae
  - Genus Lampronycteris
    - Yellow-throated big-eared bat (Lampronycteris brachyotis)
  - Genus Micronycteris
    - Brosset's big-eared bat (Micronycteris brosseti)
    - Saint Vincent big-eared bat (Micronycteris buriri)
    - Micronycteris giovanniae
    - Hairy big-eared bat (Micronycteris hirsuta)
    - Matses' big-eared bat (Micronycteris matses)
    - Little big-eared bat (Micronycteris megalotis)
    - Common big-eared bat (Micronycteris microtis)
    - White-bellied big-eared bat (Micronycteris minuta)
    - Sanborn's big-eared bat (Micronycteris sanborni)
    - Schmidts's big-eared bat (Micronycteris schmidtorum)
    - Yates's big-eared bat (Micronycteris yatesi)
- Subfamily Phyllostominae
  - Genus †Notonycteris
  - Tribe Macrophyllini
    - Genus Macrophyllum
      - Long-legged bat (Macrophyllum macrophyllum)
    - Genus Trachops
      - Fringe-lipped bat (Trachops cirrhosus)
  - Tribe Phyllostomini
    - Genus Gardnerycteris
      - Striped hairy-nosed bat (Gardnerycteris crenulata)
      - Koepcke's hairy-nosed bat (Gardnerycteris koepckeae)
    - Genus Lophostoma
      - Pygmy round-eared bat (Lophostoma brasiliense)
      - Carriker's round-eared bat (Lophostoma carrikeri)
      - Davis's round-eared bat (Lophostoma evotis)
      - Kalko's round-eared bat (Lophostoma kalkoae)
      - Western round-eared bat (Lophostoma occidentale)
      - Schultz's round-eared bat (Lophostoma schulzi)
      - White-throated round-eared bat (Lophostoma silvicola)
    - Genus Phylloderma
      - Pale-faced bat (Phylloderma stenops)
    - Genus Phyllostomus
      - Pale spear-nosed bat (Phyllostomus discolor)
      - Lesser spear-nosed bat (Phyllostomus elongatus)
      - Greater spear-nosed bat (Phyllostomus hastatus)
      - Guianan spear-nosed bat (Phyllostomus latifolius)
    - Genus Tonatia
      - Greater round-eared bat (Tonatia bidens)
      - Stripe-headed round-eared bat (Tonatia saurophila)
  - Tribe Vampyrini
    - Genus Chrotopterus
      - Big-eared woolly bat (Chrotopterus auritus)
    - Genus Mimon
      - Golden bat (Mimon bennettii)
      - Cozumelan golden bat (Mimon cozumelae)
    - Genus Vampyrum
      - Spectral bat (Vampyrum spectrum)
- Subfamily: Rhinophyllinae
  - Genus Rhinophylla
    - Hairy little fruit bat (Rhinophylla alethina)
    - Fischer's little fruit bat (Rhinophylla fischerae)
    - Dwarf little fruit bat (Rhinophylla pumilio)
- Subfamily: Stenodermatinae
  - Tribe Stenodermatini
    - Genus Ametrida
      - Little white-shouldered bat (Ametrida centurio)
    - Genus Ardops
      - Tree bat (Ardops nichollsi)
    - Genus Ariteus
      - Jamaican fig-eating bat (Ariteus flavescens)
    - Genus Artibeus
      - Artibeus aequatorialis
      - Large fruit-eating bat (Artibeus amplus)
      - Brown fruit-eating bat (Artibeus concolor)
      - Fringed fruit-eating bat (Artibeus fimbriatus)
      - Fraternal fruit-eating bat (Artibeus fraterculus)
      - Hairy fruit-eating bat (Artibeus hirsutus)
      - Honduran fruit-eating bat (Artibeus inopinatus)
      - Jamaican fruit bat (Artibeus jamaicensis)
      - Great fruit-eating bat (Artibeus lituratus)
      - Dark fruit-eating bat (Artibeus obscurus)
      - Flat-faced fruit-eating bat (Artibeus planirostris)
      - Artibeus schwartzi
    - Genus Centurio
      - Wrinkle-faced bat (Centurio senex)
    - Genus Chiroderma
      - Brazilian big-eyed bat (Chiroderma doriae)
      - Guadeloupe big-eyed bat (Chiroderma improvisum)
      - Salvin's big-eyed bat (Chiroderma salvini)
      - Little big-eyed bat (Chiroderma trinitatum)
      - Hairy big-eyed bat (Chiroderma villosum)
      - Chiroderma vizottoi
    - Genus Ectophylla
      - Honduran white bat (Ectophylla alba)
    - Genus Enchisthenes
      - Velvety fruit-eating bat (Enchisthenes hartii)
    - Genus Mesophylla
      - MacConnell's bat (Mesophylla macconnelli)
    - Genus Phyllops
      - Cuban fig-eating bat (Phyllops falcatus)
    - Genus Pygoderma
      - Ipanema bat (Pygoderma bilabiatum)
    - Genus Platyrrhinus
      - Platyrrhinus albericoi
      - Slender broad-nosed bat (Platyrrhinus angustirostris)
      - Platyrrhinus aquilus
      - Eldorado broad-nosed bat (Platyrrhinus aurarius)
      - Short-headed broad-nosed bat (Platyrrhinus brachycephalus)
      - Choco broad-nosed bat (Platyrrhinus chocoensis)
      - Thomas's broad-nosed bat (Platyrrhinus dorsalis)
      - Brown-bellied broad-nosed bat (Platyrrhinus fusciventris)
      - Heller's broad-nosed bat (Platyrrhinus helleri)
      - Platyrrhinus incarum
      - Buffy broad-nosed bat (Platyrrhinus infuscus)
      - Platyrrhinus ismaeli
      - White-lined broad-nosed bat (Platyrrhinus lineatus)
      - Quechua broad-nosed bat (Platyrrhinus masu)
      - Matapalo broad-nosed bat (Platyrrhinus matapalensis)
      - Western broad-nosed bat (Platyrrhinus nitelinea)
      - Recife broad-nosed bat (Platyrrhinus recifinus)
      - Shadowy broad-nosed bat (Platyrrhinus umbratus)
      - Greater broad-nosed bat (Platyrrhinus vittatus)
    - Genus Sphaeronycteris
      - Visored bat (Sphaeronycteris toxophyllum)
    - Genus Stenoderma
      - Red fruit bat (Stenoderma rufum)
    - Genus Uroderma
      - Tent-making bat (Uroderma bilobatum)
      - Brown tent-making bat (Uroderma magnirostrum)
    - Genus Vampyressa
      - Melissa's yellow-eared bat (Vampyressa melissa)
      - Southern little yellow-eared bat (Vampyressa pusilla)
      - Northern little yellow-eared bat (Vampyressa thyone)
    - Genus Vampyriscus
      - Bidentate yellow-eared bat (Vampyriscus bidens)
      - Brock's yellow-eared bat (Vampyriscus brocki)
      - Vampyriscus nymphaeus
    - Genus Vampyrodes
      - Great stripe-faced bat (Vampyrodes caraccioli)
      - Vampyrodes major
  - Tribe Sturnirini
    - Genus Sturnira
      - Sturnira angeli
      - Aratathomas's yellow-shouldered bat (Sturnira aratathomasi)
      - Sturnira bakeri
      - Bidentate yellow-shouldered bat (Sturnira bidens)
      - Bogota yellow-shouldered bat (Sturnira bogotensis)
      - Burton's yellow-shouldered bat (Sturnira burtonlimi)
      - Hairy yellow-shouldered bat (Sturnira erythromos)
      - Sturnira hondurensis
      - Sturnira koopmanhilli
      - Little yellow-shouldered bat (Sturnira lilium)
      - Highland yellow-shouldered bat (Sturnira ludovici)
      - Louis's yellow-shouldered bat (Sturnira luisi)
      - Greater yellow-shouldered bat (Sturnira magna)
      - Mistratoan yellow-shouldered bat (Sturnira mistratensis)
      - Talamancan yellow-shouldered bat (Sturnira mordax)
      - Lesser yellow-shouldered bat (Sturnira nana)
      - Tschudi's yellow-shouldered bat (Sturnira oporaphilum)
      - Sturnira parvidens
      - Sturnira paulsoni
      - Sturnira perla
      - Soriano's yellow-shouldered bat (Sturnira sorianoi)
      - Tilda's yellow-shouldered bat (Sturnira tildae)
