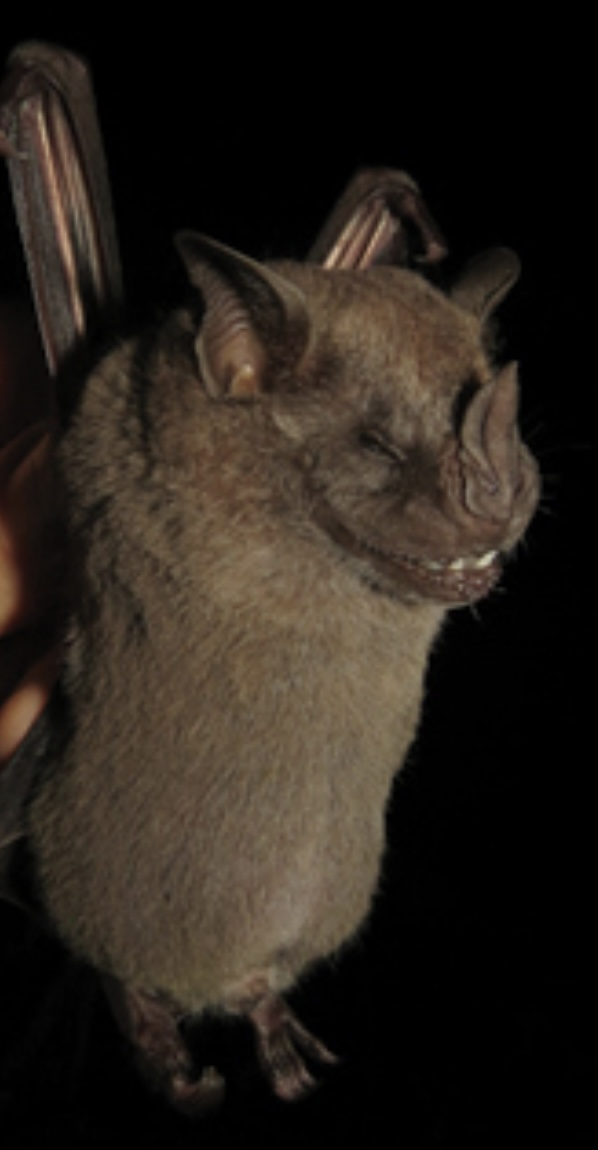

Conservation status
- Least Concern (IUCN 3.1)

Scientific classification
- Kingdom: Animalia
- Phylum: Chordata
- Class: Mammalia
- Order: Chiroptera
- Family: Phyllostomidae
- Genus: Artibeus
- Species: A. amplus

Binomial name
- Artibeus amplus Handley, 1987

= Large fruit-eating bat =

Species of bat

The large fruit-eating bat (Artibeus amplus) is a species of bat in the family Phyllostomidae. It is found in the countries of Colombia, Guyana, and Venezuela. The large fruit-eating bat is one of only a few microbats that eats leaves (a behavior seen mostly in megabats).
