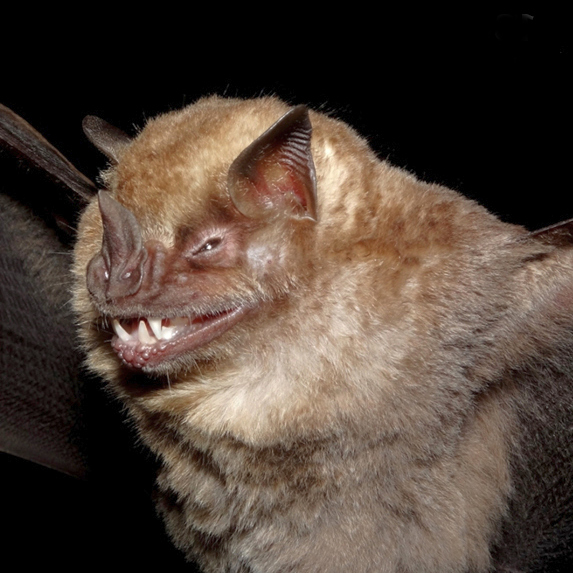

Conservation status
- Least Concern (IUCN 3.1)

Scientific classification
- Kingdom: Animalia
- Phylum: Chordata
- Class: Mammalia
- Order: Chiroptera
- Family: Phyllostomidae
- Genus: Artibeus
- Species: A. fimbriatus

Binomial name
- Artibeus fimbriatus Gray, 1838

= Fringed fruit-eating bat =

Species of bat

The fringed fruit-eating bat (Artibeus fimbriatus), is a species of bat native to South America.

== Distribution and habitat ==
Fringed fruit-eating bats inhabit regions with tropical climates and thrive in areas with little rainfall and sunny days. This species is dependent on abiotic factors in the wild. It is found in Argentina, Brazil and Paraguay.

== Behaviour and ecology ==
Their reproduction process is dependent on both the time of day and climatic factors. The process begins in warmer seasons with longer hours of daylight.

For scavenging, they mainly feed on fruits and seeds, but predominantly eat ficus and leafy bushes.

== Threats ==
While not currently threatened with extinction, changes to the forests and forest community may lead to a steadily decline in the bat population.
