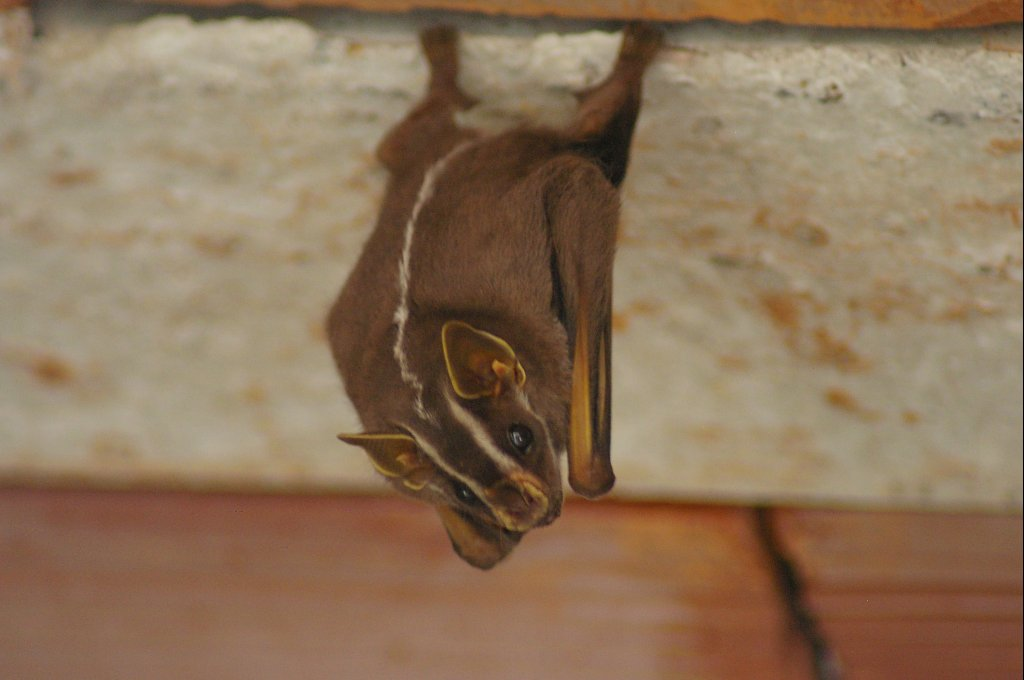

Conservation status
- Least Concern (IUCN 3.1)
- CITES Appendix III

Scientific classification
- Kingdom: Animalia
- Phylum: Chordata
- Class: Mammalia
- Order: Chiroptera
- Family: Phyllostomidae
- Genus: Platyrrhinus
- Species: P. lineatus

Binomial name
- Platyrrhinus lineatus Geoffroy, 1810

= White-lined broad-nosed bat =

Species of bat

The white-lined broad-nosed bat (Platyrrhinus lineatus) is a bat species found in southern and eastern Brazil, Paraguay, Uruguay, northern Argentina, Bolivia, Peru, Ecuador, Colombia, French Guiana and Suriname.
