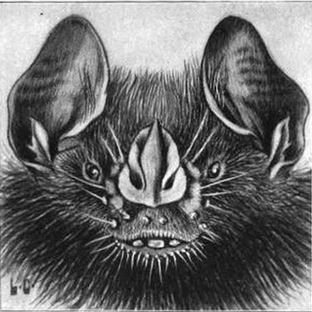

Conservation status
- Least Concern (IUCN 3.1)

Scientific classification
- Kingdom: Animalia
- Phylum: Chordata
- Class: Mammalia
- Order: Chiroptera
- Family: Phyllostomidae
- Genus: Platyrrhinus
- Species: P. vittatus

Binomial name
- Platyrrhinus vittatus Peters, 1860

= Greater broad-nosed bat =

Species of bat

The greater broad-nosed bat (Platyrrhinus vittatus) is a species of bat in the family Phyllostomidae. It is found in Bolivia, Colombia, Costa Rica, Ecuador, Panama, Peru, and Venezuela.
