= Thomas's broad-nosed bat =

Conservation status
- Least Concern (IUCN 3.1)

Scientific classification
- Kingdom: Animalia
- Phylum: Chordata
- Class: Mammalia
- Order: Chiroptera
- Family: Phyllostomidae
- Genus: Platyrrhinus
- Species: P. dorsalis

Binomial name
- Platyrrhinus dorsalis (Thomas, 1900)

Species of bat

Thomas's broad-nosed bat (Platyrrhinus dorsalis) is a species of bat in the family Phyllostomidae. It is found in Colombia and Ecuador, where it occurs on both slopes of the Andes. It is common in its range. It is frugivorous, but may eat insects as well. Its habitat is evergreen forest and forest edge of foothills and highlands. It has been found roosting under palm leaves and leaf clusters, in limestone fissures, and under overhanging roots.
