= Quechua broad-nosed bat =

Conservation status
- Least Concern (IUCN 3.1)

Scientific classification
- Kingdom: Animalia
- Phylum: Chordata
- Class: Mammalia
- Order: Chiroptera
- Family: Phyllostomidae
- Genus: Platyrrhinus
- Species: P. masu

Binomial name
- Platyrrhinus masu Velazco, 2005

Species of bat

The Quechua broad-nosed bat (Platyrrhinus masu) is a species of bat in the family Phyllostomidae. It is found in Bolivia and Peru.
