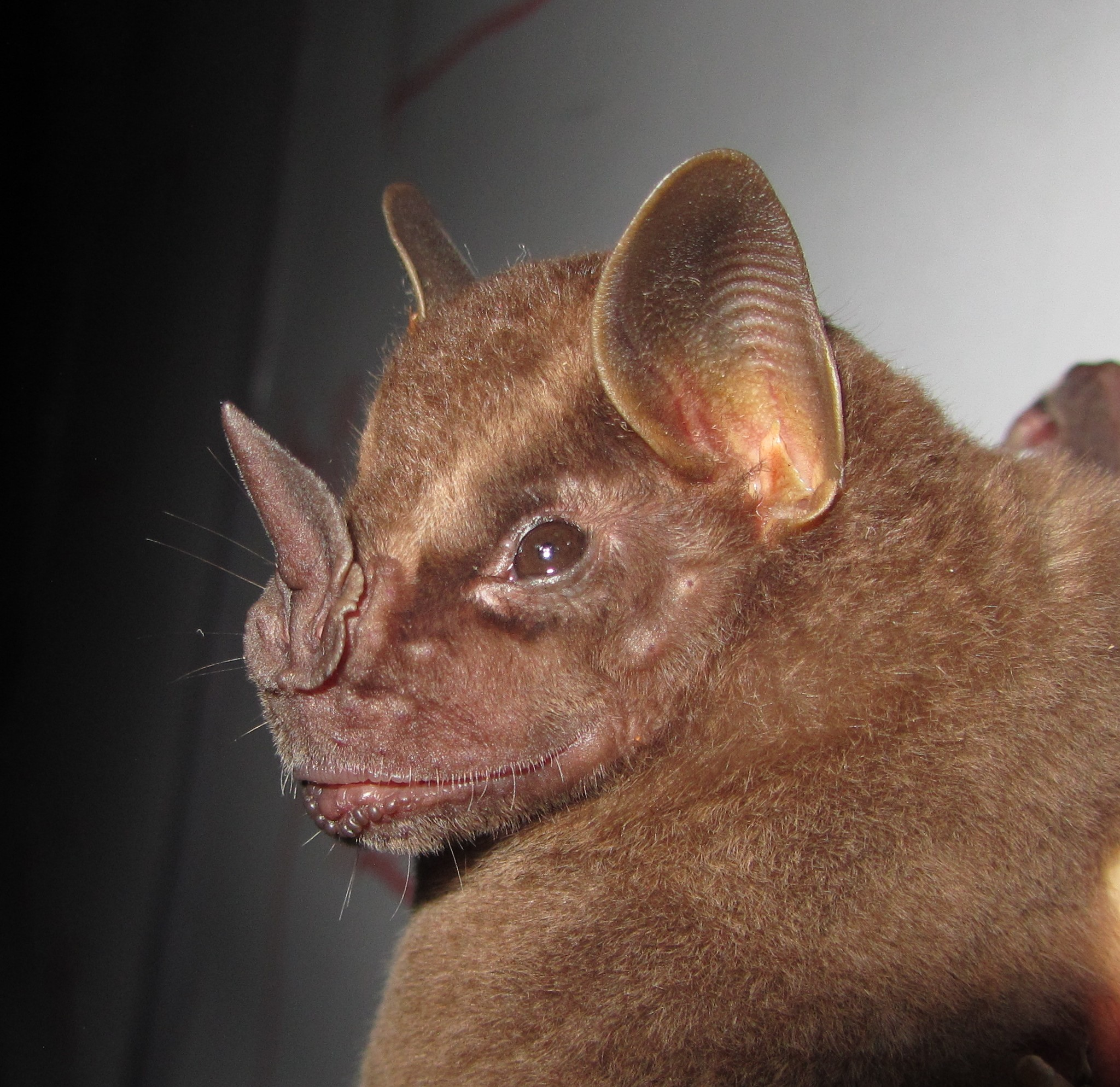

Conservation status
- Least Concern (IUCN 3.1)

Scientific classification
- Domain: Eukaryota
- Kingdom: Animalia
- Phylum: Chordata
- Class: Mammalia
- Order: Chiroptera
- Family: Phyllostomidae
- Genus: Platyrrhinus
- Species: P. infuscus

Binomial name
- Platyrrhinus infuscus Peters, 1880

= Buffy broad-nosed bat =

Species of bat

The buffy broad-nosed bat (Platyrrhinus infuscus) is a bat species found in Bolivia, western Brazil, Colombia, Ecuador, and Peru.
