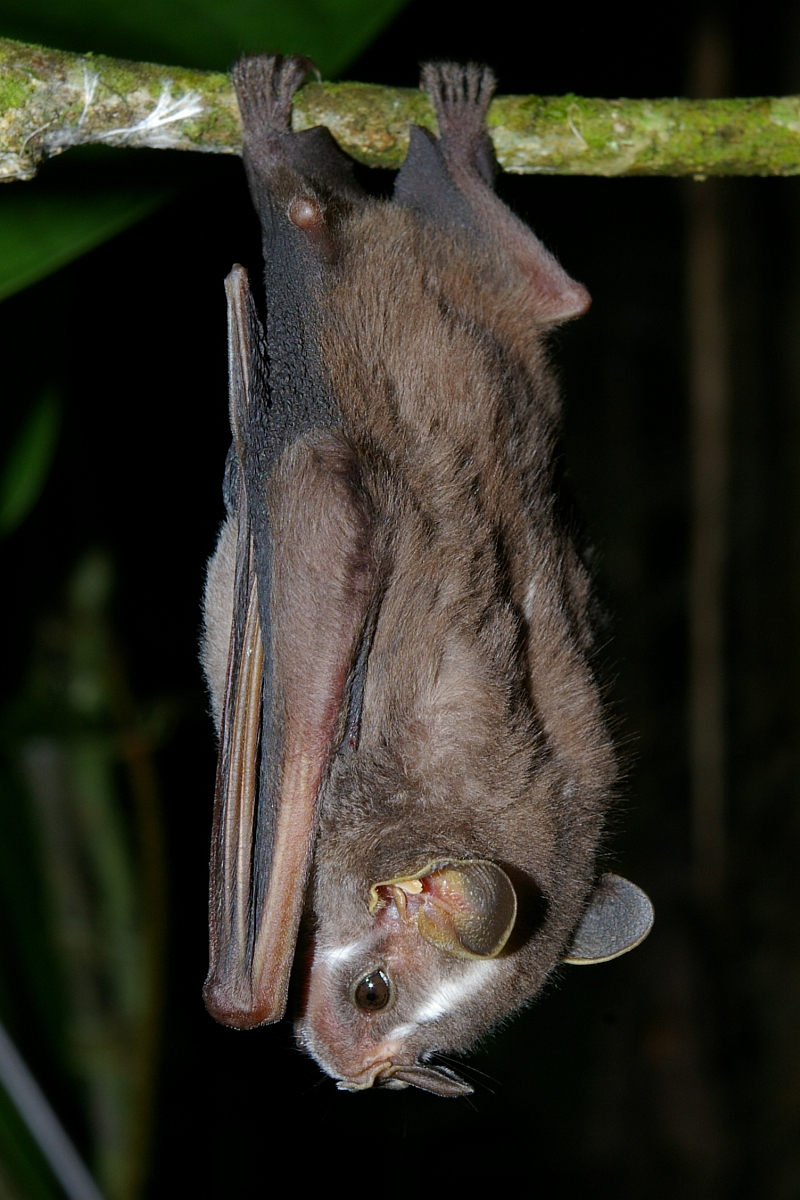

Conservation status
- Least Concern (IUCN 3.1)

Scientific classification
- Kingdom: Animalia
- Phylum: Chordata
- Class: Mammalia
- Order: Chiroptera
- Family: Phyllostomidae
- Genus: Platyrrhinus
- Species: P. helleri

Binomial name
- Platyrrhinus helleri Peters, 1866
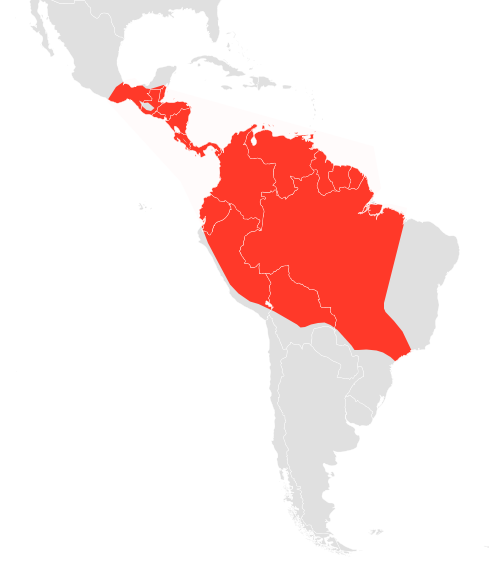
- Heller's broad-nosed bat range

= Heller's broad-nosed bat =

Species of bat

Heller's broad-nosed bat (Platyrrhinus helleri) is a bat species from South and Central America.

== Predation ==
Heller’s broad-nosed bats are probably preyed upon by snakes, birds of prey, arboreal mammals and even other bats.
