= Platyrrhinus albericoi =

Conservation status
- Least Concern (IUCN 3.1)

Scientific classification
- Kingdom: Animalia
- Phylum: Chordata
- Class: Mammalia
- Order: Chiroptera
- Family: Phyllostomidae
- Genus: Platyrrhinus
- Species: P. albericoi

Binomial name
- Platyrrhinus albericoi Velazco, 2005

Species of bat

Platyrrhinus albericoi is a species of leaf-nosed bat found in South America.

== Taxonomy ==
Platyrrhinus albericoi was described as a new species in 2005 by Velazco. The holotype had been collected in 2001 by Sergio Solari in the Paucartambo District of Peru. The eponym for the species name "albericoi" is Michael Alberico (1937-2005), who "devoted his career to the study of Colombian mammals".

== Description ==
It is a large member of its genus, with a forearm length of 62–63 mm (2.4–2.5 in). Individuals weigh 55–68 g (1.9–2.4 oz). The fur of its back is dark brown, while the fur of its belly is a paler brown. It has distinct white stripes that run the length of its face, in addition to a white stripe that runs down the middle of its back.

== Range and habitat ==
P. albericoi occurs in the South American countries of Bolivia, Colombia, Ecuador, and Peru. It has been documented at a range of elevations from 1,480–2,500 m (4,860–8,200 ft) above sea level. It is found in forested habitat.
