= Eldorado broad-nosed bat =

Conservation status
- Least Concern (IUCN 3.1)

Scientific classification
- Kingdom: Animalia
- Phylum: Chordata
- Class: Mammalia
- Order: Chiroptera
- Family: Phyllostomidae
- Genus: Platyrrhinus
- Species: P. aurarius

Binomial name
- Platyrrhinus aurarius Handley & Ferris, 1972

Species of bat

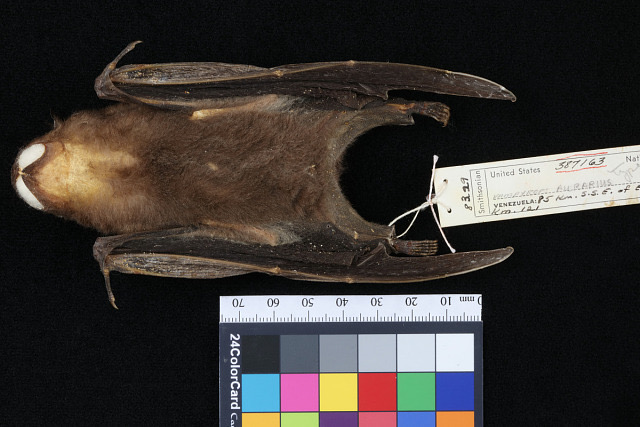
Platyrrhinus aurarius.

The Eldorado broad-nosed bat (Platyrrhinus aurarius) is a species of bat in the family Phyllostomidae. It is found in Guyana, Suriname, northern Brazil, and southern Venezuela.
