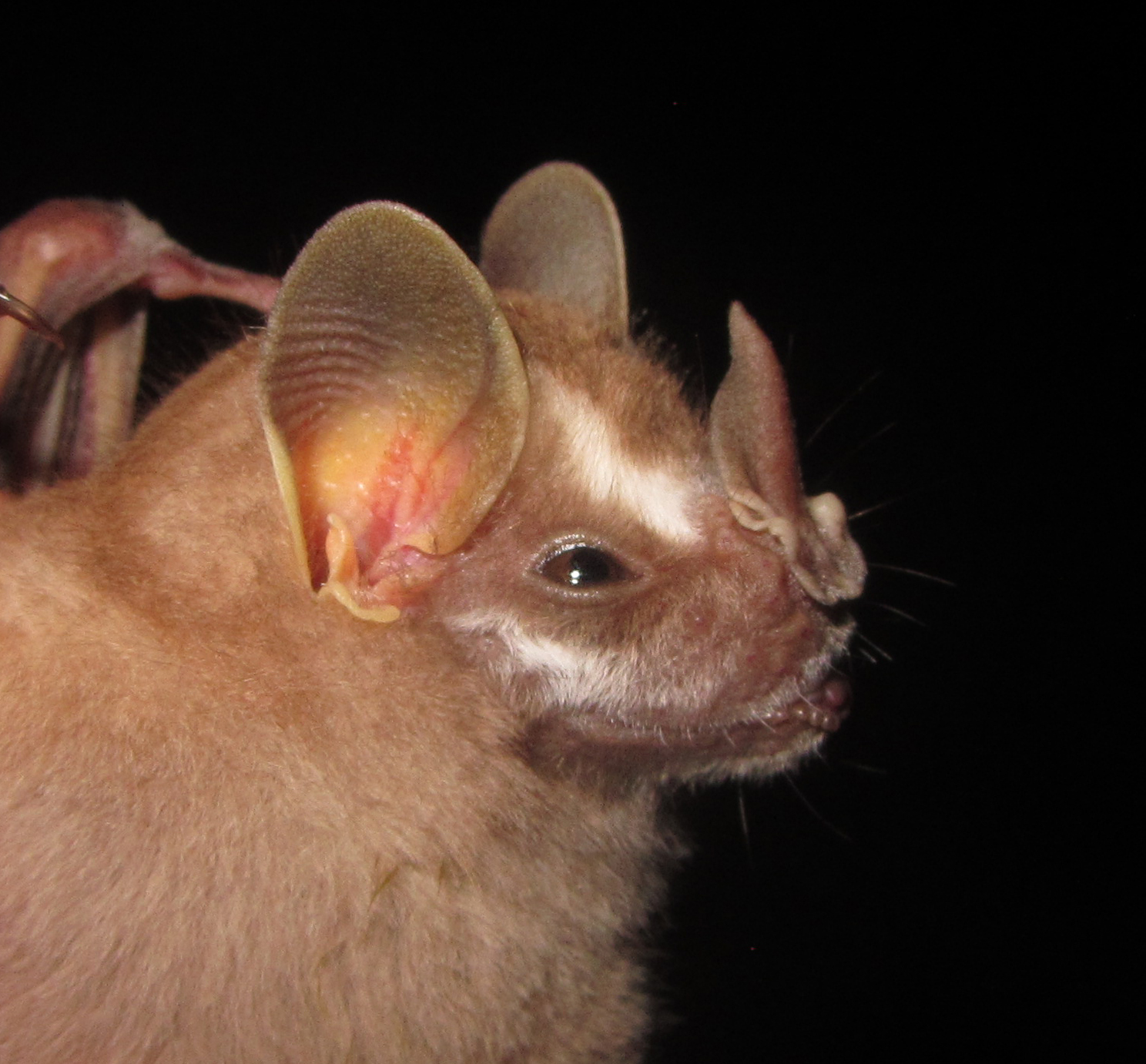

Conservation status
- Least Concern (IUCN 3.1)

Scientific classification
- Kingdom: Animalia
- Phylum: Chordata
- Class: Mammalia
- Order: Chiroptera
- Family: Phyllostomidae
- Genus: Platyrrhinus
- Species: P. incarum

Binomial name
- Platyrrhinus incarum Thomas, 1912

= Incan broad-nosed bat =

Species of bat

The Incan broad-nosed bat (Platyrrhinus incarum) is a bat species from the Amazon basin of South America.

== Taxonomy ==
This species was formerly considered a subspecies of Heller's broad-nosed bat (Platyrrhinus helleri), but was split following phylogenetic and morphometric analysis of the Platyrrhinus genus. The Incan broad-nosed bat, following this split, is the only member of its genus which occurs in Brazil.
