= List of phyllostomids =

Species in mammal family Phyllostomidae

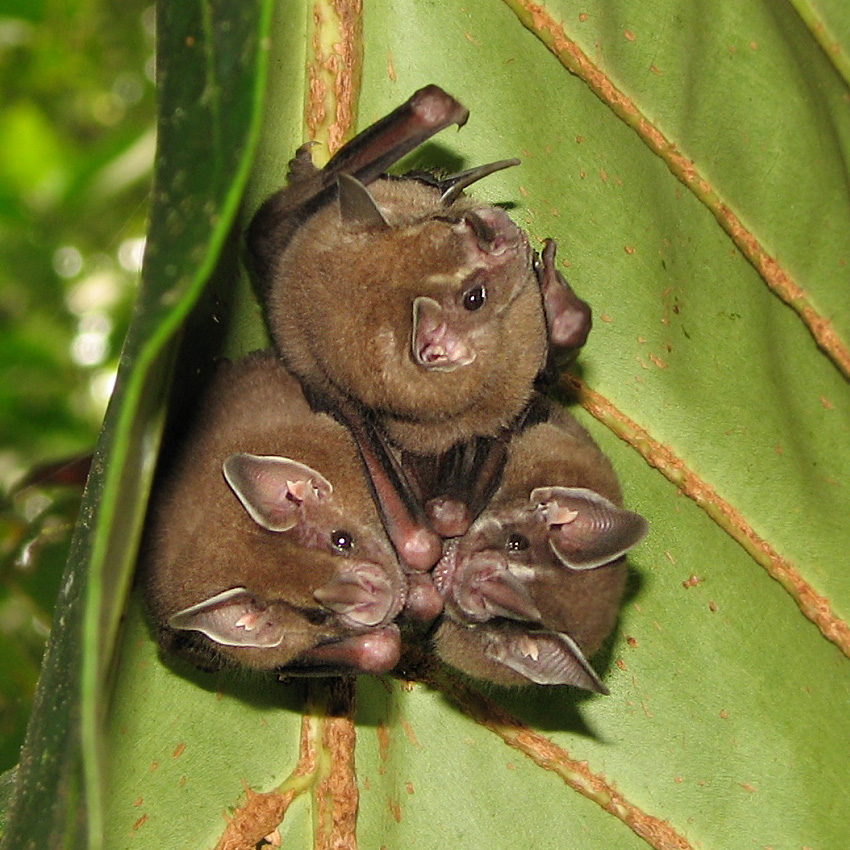
Neotropical fruit bats (Artibeus)

Phyllostomidae is one of the twenty families of bats in the mammalian order Chiroptera and is part of the microbat suborder. Members of this family are called phyllostomids or leaf-nosed bats. They are found in South America, Central America, and southern North America, primarily in forests and caves, though some species can also be found in grasslands, savannas, or wetlands. They range in size from the little white-shouldered bat, at 3 cm (1 in) and no tail, to the greater spear-nosed bat, at 13 cm (5 in) plus a 4 cm (2 in) tail. Like all bats, phyllostomids are capable of true and sustained flight, and have forearm lengths ranging from multiple species with 3 cm (1 in), to the greater spear-nosed bat at 10 cm (4 in). They primarily eat insects, fruit, nectar, and pollen, though the greater spear-nosed bat, big-eared woolly bat, and spectral bat will also eat birds, bats, and small mammals, and the three vampire bat species of the subfamily Desmodontinae solely consume blood. Almost no phyllostomids have population estimates, though the greater long-nosed bat, Bokermann's nectar bat, Dekeyser's nectar bat, Fernandez's sword-nosed bat, Guadeloupe big-eyed bat, and lesser yellow-shouldered bat are categorized as endangered species, and the Jamaican flower bat is categorized as critically endangered with a population as low as around 250 mature individuals.

The 231 extant species of Phyllostomidae are divided into 11 subfamilies: Carolliinae, with 8 species in a single genus; Desmodontinae, with 3 species in 3 genera; Glossophaginae, with 37 species in 16 genera; Glyphonycterinae, with 5 species in 3 genera; Lonchophyllinae, with 16 species in 2 genera; Lonchorhininae, with a single genus of 5 species; Macrotinae, with a single genus of 2 species; Micronycterinae, with 12 species in 2 genera; Phyllostominae, with 22 species in 10 genera; Rhinophyllinae, with a single genus of 3 species; and Stenodermatinae, with 89 species in 20 genera. Several extinct prehistoric phyllostomid species have been discovered, though due to ongoing research and discoveries the exact number and categorization is not fixed.

== Conventions ==
IUCN Red List categories
Conservation status
- EX: Extinct (0 species)
- EW: Extinct in the wild (0 species)
- CR: Critically endangered (1 species)
- EN: Endangered (6 species)
- VU: Vulnerable (6 species)
- NT: Near threatened (14 species)
- LC: Least concern (140 species)

Other categories
- DD: Data deficient (35 species)
- NE: Not evaluated (29 species)

The author citation for the species or genus is given after the scientific name; parentheses around the author citation indicate that this was not the original taxonomic placement. Conservation status codes listed follow the International Union for Conservation of Nature (IUCN) Red List of Threatened Species. Range maps are provided wherever possible; if a range map is not available, a description of the phyllostomid's range is provided. Ranges are based on the IUCN Red List for that species unless otherwise noted.

== Classification ==
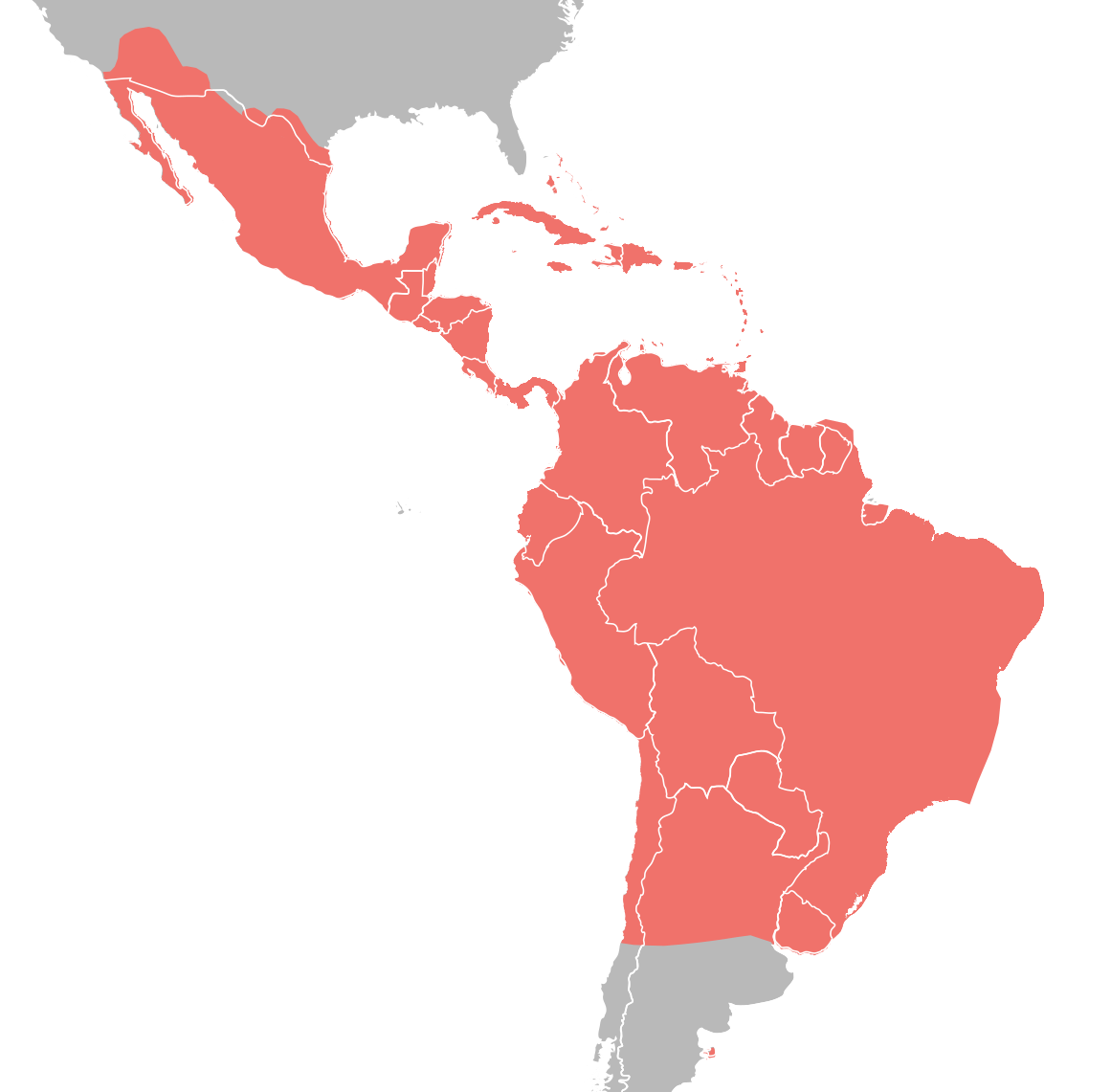
Phyllostomidae distribution

Phyllostomidae is a family that consists of 231 extant species in 61 genera divided into eleven subfamilies: Carolliinae, Desmodontinae, Glossophaginae, Glyphonycterinae, Lonchophyllinae, Lonchorhininae, Macrotinae, Micronycterinae, Phyllostominae, Rhinophyllinae, and Stenodermatinae.

Family Phyllostomidae

- Subfamily Carolliinae
  - Genus Carollia (short-tailed bats): eight species
- Subfamily Desmodontinae
  - Genus Desmodus (common vampire bat): one species
  - Genus Diaemus (white-winged vampire bat): one species
  - Genus Diphylla (hairy-legged vampire bat): one species
- Subfamily Glossophaginae
  - Genus Anoura (tailless bats): ten species
  - Genus Brachyphylla (fruit-eating bats): two species
  - Genus Choeroniscus (long-tailed bats): three species
  - Genus Choeronycteris (Mexican long-tongued bat): one species
  - Genus Dryadonycteris (Capixaba nectar-feeding bat): one species
  - Genus Erophylla (flower bats): two species
  - Genus Glossophaga (long-tongued bats): nine species
  - Genus Hylonycteris (Underwood's long-tongued bat): one species
  - Genus Leptonycteris (long-nosed bats): three species
  - Genus Lichonycteris (little long-tongued bats): two species
  - Genus Monophyllus (single leaf bats): two species
  - Genus Musonycteris (banana bat): one species
  - Genus Phyllonycteris (flower bats): two species
  - Genus Platalina (long-snouted bat): one species
  - Genus Scleronycteris (Ega long-tongued bat): one species
  - Genus Xeronycteris (Vieira's long-tongued bat): one species
- Subfamily Glyphonycterinae
  - Genus Glyphonycteris (big-eared bats): three species
  - Genus Neonycteris (least big-eared bat): one species
  - Genus Trinycteris (Niceforo's big-eared bat): one species
- Subfamily Lonchophyllinae
  - Genus Hsunycteris (nectar bats): four species
  - Genus Lionycteris (chestnut long-tongued bat): one species
  - Genus Lonchophylla (nectar bats): thirteen species
- Subfamily Lonchorhininae
  - Genus Lonchorhina (sword-nosed bats): six species
- Subfamily Macrotinae
  - Genus Macrotus (leaf-nosed bats): two species
- Subfamily Micronycterinae
  - Genus Lampronycteris (yellow-throated big-eared bat): one species
  - Genus Micronycteris (big-eared bats): thirteen species
- Subfamily Phyllostominae
  - Genus Chrotopterus (big-eared woolly bat): one species
  - Genus Gardnerycteris (hairy-nosed bats): three species
  - Genus Lophostoma (round-eared bats): eight species
  - Genus Macrophyllum (long-legged bat): one species
  - Genus Mimon (golden bats): two species
  - Genus Phylloderma (pale-faced bats): two species
  - Genus Phyllostomus (spear-nosed bats): four species
  - Genus Tonatia (round-eared bats): three species
  - Genus Trachops (fringe-lipped bats): three species
  - Genus Vampyrum (spectral bat): one species
- Subfamily Rhinophyllinae
  - Genus Rhinophylla (little fruit bats): three species
- Subfamily Stenodermatinae
  - Genus Ametrida (little white-shouldered bat): one species
  - Genus Ardops (tree bat): one species
  - Genus Ariteus (Jamaican fig-eating bat): one species
  - Genus Artibeus (neotropical fruit bats): thirteen species
  - Genus Centurio (wrinkle-faced bat): one species
  - Genus Chiroderma (big-eyed bats): seven species
  - Genus Dermanura (fruit-eating bats): eleven species
  - Genus Ectophylla (Honduran white bat): one species
  - Genus Enchisthenes (velvety fruit-eating bat): one species
  - Genus Mesophylla (MacConnell's bat): one species
  - Genus Phyllops (Cuban fig-eating bat): one species
  - Genus Platyrrhinus (broad-nosed bats): nineteen species
  - Genus Pygoderma (Ipanema bat): one species
  - Genus Sphaeronycteris (visored bat): one species
  - Genus Stenoderma (red fruit bat): one species
  - Genus Sturnira (yellow-shouldered bats): twenty-five species
  - Genus Uroderma (tent-making bats): five species
  - Genus Vampyressa (little yellow-eared bats): six species
  - Genus Vampyriscus (yellow-eared bats): three species
  - Genus Vampyrodes (stripe-faced bats): two species

- Phyllostomidae
  - Macrotinae
  - - Micronycterinae
    - - Desmodontinae
      - - Lonchorhininae
        - - Phyllostominae
          - - - - Lonchophyllinae
                - - Rhinophyllinae
                  - Stenodermatinae
              - - Carolliinae
                - Glyphonycterinae
            - Glossophaginae

== Phyllostomids ==
The following classification is based on the taxonomy described by the reference work Mammal Species of the World (2005), with augmentation by generally accepted proposals made since using molecular phylogenetic analysis, as supported by both the IUCN SSC Bat Specialist Group and the American Society of Mammalogists.

=== Subfamily Carolliinae ===
Genus Carollia – Gray, 1838 – eight species
Common name	Scientific name and subspecies	Range	Size and ecology	IUCN status and estimated population
Benkeith's short-tailed bat	C. benkeithi Solari & Baker, 2006	Central South America	Size: 5–6 cm (2 in) long, plus 0.5–2 cm (0.2–0.8 in) tail 3–4 cm (1–2 in) forearm length Habitat: Forest	LC Unknown
Chestnut short-tailed bat	C. castanea H. Allen, 1821	Central America and northern South America	Size: 4–6 cm (2 in) long, plus 0.5–2 cm (0.2–0.8 in) tail 3–4 cm (1–2 in) forearm length Habitat: Forest	LC Unknown
Gray short-tailed bat	C. subrufa (Hahn, 1905)	Central America	Size: 5–8 cm (2–3 in) long, plus 0.5–2 cm (0.2–0.8 in) tail 3–4 cm (1–2 in) forearm length Habitat: Forest and caves	LC Unknown
Manu short-tailed bat	C. manu Pacheco, Solari, & Velazco, 2004	Western South America	Size: 5–7 cm (2–3 in) long, plus 0.5–1 cm (0.2–0.4 in) tail 4–5 cm (2 in) forearm length Habitat: Forest	LC Unknown
Mono's short-tailed bat	C. monohernandezi Muñoz, Cuartas, & González, 2004	Northern South America	Size: About 5 cm (2 in) long, plus about 1 cm (0.4 in) tail about 4 cm (2 in) forearm length Habitat: Forest	DD Unknown
Seba's short-tailed bat	C. perspicillata (Linnaeus, 1758)	Mexico, Central America, and South America	Size: 4–7 cm (2–3 in) long, plus 0.5–2 cm (0.2–0.8 in) tail 4–5 cm (2 in) forearm length Habitat: Forest and caves	LC Unknown
Silky short-tailed bat	C. brevicauda Wied-Neuwied, 1821	Central America and northern South America	Size: 4–6 cm (2 in) long, plus 0.5–2 cm (0.2–0.8 in) tail 3–5 cm (1–2 in) forearm length Habitat: Forest and savanna	LC Unknown
Sowell's short-tailed bat	C. sowelli Baker, Solari, & Hoffmann, 2002	Mexico and Central America	Size: 6–8 cm (2–3 in) long, plus 0.5–2 cm (0.2–0.8 in) tail 3–5 cm (1–2 in) forearm length Habitat: Unknown	LC Unknown

=== Subfamily Desmodontinae ===
Genus Desmodus – Wied-Neuwied, 1826 – one species
Common name	Scientific name and subspecies	Range	Size and ecology	IUCN status and estimated population
Common vampire bat	D. rotundus (Geoffroy, 1810)	Mexico, Central America, and South America	Size: 6–10 cm (2–4 in) long, with no tail 5–7 cm (2–3 in) forearm length Habitat: Rocky areas and caves	LC Unknown

Genus Diaemus – Miller, 1906 – one species
Common name	Scientific name and subspecies	Range	Size and ecology	IUCN status and estimated population
White-winged vampire bat	D. youngi Jentink, 1893	Mexico, Central America, and northern South America	Size: 8–9 cm (3–4 in) long, with no tail 5–6 cm (2 in) forearm length Habitat: Forest and caves	LC Unknown

Genus Diphylla – Spix, 1823 – one species
Common name	Scientific name and subspecies	Range	Size and ecology	IUCN status and estimated population
Hairy-legged vampire bat	D. ecaudata Spix, 1823	Mexico, Central America, and northern South America	Size: 6–10 cm (2–4 in) long, with no tail 4–6 cm (2 in) forearm length Habitat: Forest, grassland, and caves	LC Unknown

=== Subfamily Glossophaginae ===
Genus Anoura – Gray, 1838 – ten species
Common name	Scientific name and subspecies	Range	Size and ecology	IUCN status and estimated population
Broad-toothed tailless bat	A. latidens Handley, 1984	Northwestern South America	Size: 5–8 cm (2–3 in) long, with no tail 4–5 cm (2 in) forearm length Habitat: Forest and caves	LC Unknown
Cadena's tailless bat	A. cadenai Mantilla-Meluk & Baker, 2006	Northwestern South America	Size: 5–7 cm (2–3 in) long, with no tail 3–4 cm (1–2 in) forearm length Habitat: Forest	DD Unknown
Equatorial tailless bat	A. aequatoris (Lönnberg, 1921)	Western South America	Size: 5–6 cm (2 in) long, plus 0–1 cm (0.0–0.4 in) tail 3–4 cm (1–2 in) forearm length Habitat: Forest	LC Unknown
Geoffroy's tailless bat	A. geoffroyi Gray, 1838 Two subspecies: A. g. geoffroyi; A. g. lasiopyga	Mexico, Central America, and northern South America	Size: 5–8 cm (2–3 in) long, with no tail 4–5 cm (2 in) forearm length Habitat: Forest and caves	LC Unknown
Handley's tailless bat	A. cultrata Handley, 1960	Central America, and northern and western South America	Size: 5–8 cm (2–3 in) long, plus 0–0.5 cm (0.0–0.2 in) tail 3–5 cm (1–2 in) forearm length Habitat: Forest and caves	LC Unknown
Javier's tailless bat	A. javieri Pacheco, Sánchez-Vendizú, & Solari, 2018	Peru and Bolivia	Size: 6–7 cm (2–3 in) long, plus 0–1 cm (0.0–0.4 in) tail 3–4 cm (1–2 in) forearm length Habitat: Forest	NE Unknown
Luis Manuel's tailless bat	A. luismanueli Molinari, 1994	Northwestern South America	Size: 5–6 cm (2 in) long, plus 0–0.5 cm (0.0–0.2 in) tail 3–4 cm (1–2 in) forearm length Habitat: Forest and caves	LC Unknown
Tailed tailless bat	A. caudifer (Geoffroy, 1818)	South America	Size: 4–7 cm (2–3 in) long, plus about 0.5 cm (0.2 in) tail 3–4 cm (1–2 in) forearm length Habitat: Forest	LC Unknown
Tschudi's tailless bat	A. peruana Tschudi, 1844	Northwestern South America	Size: 5–9 cm (2–4 in) long, with no tail 4–5 cm (2 in) forearm length Habitat: Forest, shrubland, and caves	LC Unknown
Tube-lipped nectar bat	A. fistulata Muchhala, Mena, & Viteri, 2005	Western South America	Size: 5–7 cm (2–3 in) long, plus 0–1 cm (0.0–0.4 in) tail 3–4 cm (1–2 in) forearm length Habitat: Forest	DD Unknown

Genus Brachyphylla – Gray, 1834 – two species
Common name	Scientific name and subspecies	Range	Size and ecology	IUCN status and estimated population
Antillean fruit-eating bat	B. cavernarum Gray, 1834 Three subspecies: B. c. cavernarum; B. c. intermedia; B. c. minor	Caribbean	Size: 8–10 cm (3–4 in) long, with no tail 6–7 cm (2–3 in) forearm length Habitat: Forest and caves	LC Unknown
Cuban fruit-eating bat	B. nana Miller, 1902	Caribbean	Size: 7–9 cm (3–4 in) long, with no tail 5–7 cm (2–3 in) forearm length Habitat: Caves	LC Unknown

Genus Choeroniscus – Thomas, 1928 – three species
Common name	Scientific name and subspecies	Range	Size and ecology	IUCN status and estimated population
Godman's long-tailed bat	C. godmani Thomas, 1903	Mexico, Central America, and northern South America	Size: 5–7 cm (2–3 in) long, plus 0.5–2 cm (0.2–0.8 in) tail 3–4 cm (1–2 in) forearm length Habitat: Forest	LC Unknown
Greater long-tailed bat	C. periosus Handley, 1966 Two subspecies: C. p. periosus; C. p. ponsi	Northwestern South America	Size: About 7 cm (3 in) long, plus 0.5–1 cm (0.2–0.4 in) tail unknown forearm length Habitat: Forest	VU Unknown
Lesser long-tongued bat	C. minor Peters, 1868	Northern South America	Size: 5–6 cm (2 in) long, plus 0–2 cm (0.0–0.8 in) tail 2–4 cm (1–2 in) forearm length Habitat: Forest and inland wetlands	LC Unknown

Genus Choeronycteris – Tschudi, 1844 – one species
Common name	Scientific name and subspecies	Range	Size and ecology	IUCN status and estimated population
Mexican long-tongued bat	C. mexicana Tschudi, 1844	Mexico, Central America, and southern United States	Size: 8–11 cm (3–4 in) long, plus 0.5–2 cm (0.2–0.8 in) tail 3–5 cm (1–2 in) forearm length Habitat: Forest, caves, and desert	NT Unknown

Genus Dryadonycteris – Nogueira, Lima, Peracchi, & Simmons, 2012 – one species
Common name	Scientific name and subspecies	Range	Size and ecology	IUCN status and estimated population
Capixaba nectar-feeding bat	D. capixaba Nogueira, Lima, Peracchi, & Simmons, 2012	Eastern Brazil	Size: 5–6 cm (2 in) long, plus 0–1 cm (0.0–0.4 in) tail 2–4 cm (1–2 in) forearm length Habitat: Forest	DD Unknown

Genus Erophylla – Miller, 1906 – two species
Common name	Scientific name and subspecies	Range	Size and ecology	IUCN status and estimated population
Brown flower bat	E. bombifrons Miller, 1899 Two subspecies: E. b. bombifrons; E. b. santacristobalensis	Puerto Rico and island of Hispaniola	Size: 8–9 cm (3–4 in) long, plus 1–2 cm (0–1 in) tail 4–6 cm (2 in) forearm length Habitat: Caves	LC Unknown
Buffy flower bat	E. sezekorni (Miller, 1906) Four subspecies: E. s. mariguanensis; E. s. planifrons; E. s. sezekorni; E. s. syops	Caribbean	Size: 6–9 cm (2–4 in) long, plus 1–2 cm (0–1 in) tail 4–6 cm (2 in) forearm length Habitat: Caves	LC Unknown

Genus Glossophaga – Geoffroy, 1818 – nine species
Common name	Scientific name and subspecies	Range	Size and ecology	IUCN status and estimated population
Baker's long-tongued bat	G. bakeri Webster & Jones, 1987	Northern and central South America	Size: 5–7 cm (2–3 in) long, plus 0.5–1 cm (0.2–0.4 in) tail 3–4 cm (1–2 in) forearm length Habitat: Forest	NE Unknown
Commissaris's long-tongued bat	G. commissarisi Gardner, 1962 Two subspecies: G. c. commissarisi; G. c. hespera	Mexico, Central America, and northern South America	Size: 4–7 cm (2–3 in) long, plus 0.5–2 cm (0.2–0.8 in) tail 3–4 cm (1–2 in) forearm length Habitat: Forest	LC Unknown
Gray long-tongued bat	G. leachii Gray, 1844	Mexico and Central America	Size: 4–7 cm (2–3 in) long, plus 0.5–2 cm (0.2–0.8 in) tail 3–4 cm (1–2 in) forearm length Habitat: Forest and caves	LC Unknown
Jamaican long-tongued bat	G. antillarum Rehn, 1902	Jamaica	Size: 5–6 cm (2 in) long, plus 0.5–1 cm (0.2–0.4 in) tail 3–4 cm (1–2 in) forearm length Habitat: Forest, savanna, and caves	NE Unknown
Miller's long-tongued bat	G. longirostris Miller, 1898 Seven subspecies: G. l. campestris; G. l. elongata; G. l. longirostris; G. l. major; G. l. maricelae; G. l. reclusa; G. l. rostrata	Northern South America	Size: 5–8 cm (2–3 in) long, plus 0.5–2 cm (0.2–0.8 in) tail 3–5 cm (1–2 in) forearm length Habitat: Forest, shrubland, and caves	LC Unknown
Pallas's long-tongued bat	G. soricina Pallas, 1766 Four subspecies: G. s. handleyi; G. s. mutica; G. s. soricina; G. s. valens	Mexico, Central America, and South America	Size: 4–6 cm (2 in) long, plus 0.5–2 cm (0.2–0.8 in) tail 3–4 cm (1–2 in) forearm length Habitat: Forest, savanna, and caves	LC Unknown
Robust long-tongued bat	G. valens Miller, 1913	Peru and Ecuador	Size: 5–6 cm (2 in) long, plus 0.5–1 cm (0.2–0.4 in) tail 3–4 cm (1–2 in) forearm length Habitat: Forest, savanna, and caves	NE Unknown
Tres Marias long-tongued bat	G. mutica Merriam, 1898	Mexico, Central America, and northwestern South America	Size: 5–6 cm (2 in) long, plus 0.5–1 cm (0.2–0.4 in) tail 3–4 cm (1–2 in) forearm length Habitat: Forest, savanna, and caves	NE Unknown
Western long-tongued bat	G. morenoi Martínez & Villa, 1938 Three subspecies: G. m. brevirostris; G. m. mexicana; G. m. morenoi	Southern Mexico	Size: 5–8 cm (2–3 in) long, plus 0.5–2 cm (0.2–0.8 in) tail 3–4 cm (1–2 in) forearm length Habitat: Forest and caves	LC Unknown

Genus Hylonycteris – Thomas, 1903 – one species
Common name	Scientific name and subspecies	Range	Size and ecology	IUCN status and estimated population
Underwood's long-tongued bat	H. underwoodi Thomas, 1903 Two subspecies: H. u. minor; H. u. underwoodi	Southern Mexico and Central America	Size: 3–6 cm (1–2 in) long, plus 0–1 cm (0.0–0.4 in) tail 3–4 cm (1–2 in) forearm length Habitat: Forest and caves	LC Unknown

Genus Leptonycteris – Lydekker, 1891 – three species
Common name	Scientific name and subspecies	Range	Size and ecology	IUCN status and estimated population
Greater long-nosed bat	L. nivalis (Saussure, 1860)	Mexico	Size: 7–9 cm (3–4 in) long, with no tail 5–6 cm (2 in) forearm length Habitat: Forest, caves, and desert	EN Unknown
Lesser long-nosed bat	L. yerbabuenae Martínez & Villa, 1940	Mexico and Central America	Size: 7–9 cm (3–4 in) long, with no tail 5–6 cm (2 in) forearm length Habitat: Forest and caves	NT Unknown
Southern long-nosed bat	L. curasoae Miller, 1900	Northern South America	Size: 7–9 cm (3–4 in) long, with no tail 5–6 cm (2 in) forearm length Habitat: Forest and caves	VU Unknown

Genus Lichonycteris – Thomas, 1895 – two species
Common name	Scientific name and subspecies	Range	Size and ecology	IUCN status and estimated population
Dark long-tongued bat	L. obscura Thomas, 1895	Mexico, Central America, and northern and eastern South America	Size: 4–6 cm (2 in) long, plus 0.5–1 cm (0.2–0.4 in) tail 3–4 cm (1–2 in) forearm length Habitat: Forest	LC Unknown
Pale brown long-nosed bat	L. degener Miller, 1931	South America	Size: 4–6 cm (2 in) long, plus 0.5–1 cm (0.2–0.4 in) tail 3–4 cm (1–2 in) forearm length Habitat: Forest	LC Unknown

Genus Monophyllus – Leach, 1821 – two species
Common name	Scientific name and subspecies	Range	Size and ecology	IUCN status and estimated population
Insular single leaf bat	M. plethodon Miller, 1900 Three subspecies: M. p. frater; M. p. luciae; M. p. plethodon	The Lesser Antilles	Size: 6–9 cm (2–4 in) long, plus 0.5–2 cm (0.2–0.8 in) tail 3–5 cm (1–2 in) forearm length Habitat: Caves	LC Unknown
Leach's single leaf bat	M. redmani Leach, 1821 Three subspecies: M. r. clinedaphus; M. r. portoricensis; M. r. redmani	Caribbean	Size: 5–8 cm (2–3 in) long, plus 0.5–2 cm (0.2–0.8 in) tail 3–5 cm (1–2 in) forearm length Habitat: Caves	LC Unknown

Genus Musonycteris – Schaldach & McLaughlin, 1960 – one species
Common name	Scientific name and subspecies	Range	Size and ecology	IUCN status and estimated population
Banana bat	M. harrisoni Schaldach & McLaughlin, 1960	Southern Mexico	Size: 8–9 cm (3–4 in) long, plus 0.5–2 cm (0.2–0.8 in) tail 4–5 cm (2 in) forearm length Habitat: Forest and caves	VU 10,000

Genus Phyllonycteris – Gundlach, 1860 – two species
Common name	Scientific name and subspecies	Range	Size and ecology	IUCN status and estimated population
Cuban flower bat	P. poeyi Gundlach, 1860 Two subspecies: P. p. obtusa; P. p. poeyi	Caribbean	Size: 7–9 cm (3–4 in) long, plus 0.5–2 cm (0.2–0.8 in) tail 4–6 cm (2 in) forearm length Habitat: Forest	LC Unknown
Jamaican flower bat	P. aphylla (Miller, 1898)	Jamaica	Size: 7–8 cm (3 in) long, plus 0.5–1 cm (0.2–0.4 in) tail 4–5 cm (2 in) forearm length Habitat: Caves	CR 250

Genus Platalina – Thomas, 1928 – one species
Common name	Scientific name and subspecies	Range	Size and ecology	IUCN status and estimated population
Long-snouted bat	P. genovensium Thomas, 1928	Western South America	Size: 6–8 cm (2–3 in) long, plus 0.5–1 cm (0.2–0.4 in) tail 4–6 cm (2 in) forearm length Habitat: Savanna and caves	NT Unknown

Genus Scleronycteris – Thomas, 1912 – one species
Common name	Scientific name and subspecies	Range	Size and ecology	IUCN status and estimated population
Ega long-tongued bat	S. ega Thomas, 1912	Northern South America	Size: 5–6 cm (2 in) long, plus 0.5–1 cm (0.2–0.4 in) tail 3–4 cm (1–2 in) forearm length Habitat: Forest	DD Unknown

Genus Xeronycteris – Gregorin & Ditchfield, 2005 – one species
Common name	Scientific name and subspecies	Range	Size and ecology	IUCN status and estimated population
Vieira's long-tongued bat	X. vieirai Gregorin & Ditchfield, 2005	Eastern South America	Size: Unknown length, plus 0.5–1 cm (0.2–0.4 in) tail 3–4 cm (1–2 in) forearm length Habitat: Forest and savanna	DD Unknown

=== Subfamily Glyphonycterinae ===
Genus Glyphonycteris – Thomas, 1896 – three species
Common name	Scientific name and subspecies	Range	Size and ecology	IUCN status and estimated population
Behn's bat	G. behnii (Peters, 1865)	Central South America	Size: Unknown length, plus about 1 cm (0 in) tail 4–5 cm (2 in) forearm length Habitat: Forest and savanna	DD Unknown
Davies's big-eared bat	G. daviesi (Hill, 1964)	Central America and northern and eastern South America	Size: 6–9 cm (2–4 in) long, plus 0.5–2 cm (0.2–0.8 in) tail 5–6 cm (2 in) forearm length Habitat: Forest	LC Unknown
Tricolored big-eared bat	G. sylvestris Thomas, 1896	Central America and northern and southeastern South America	Size: 4–6 cm (2 in) long, plus 0.5–2 cm (0.2–0.8 in) tail 3–5 cm (1–2 in) forearm length Habitat: Forest and caves	LC Unknown

Genus Neonycteris – Sanborn, 1949 – one species
Common name	Scientific name and subspecies	Range	Size and ecology	IUCN status and estimated population
Least big-eared bat	N. pusilla Sanborn, 1949	Northern South America	Size: Unknown length About 3 cm (1 in) forearm length Habitat: Forest	DD Unknown

Genus Trinycteris – Sanborn, 1949 – one species
Common name	Scientific name and subspecies	Range	Size and ecology	IUCN status and estimated population
Niceforo's big-eared bat	T. nicefori Sanborn, 1949	Central America and northern and eastern South America	Size: 5–7 cm (2–3 in) long, plus 0.5–2 cm (0.2–0.8 in) tail 3–5 cm (1–2 in) forearm length Habitat: Forest	LC Unknown

=== Subfamily Lonchophyllinae ===
Genus Hsunycteris – Parlos, Timm, Swier, Zeballos, & Baker, 2014 – four species
Common name	Scientific name and subspecies	Range	Size and ecology	IUCN status and estimated population
Cadena's long-tongued bat	H. cadenai Woodman & Timm, 2006	Northwestern South America	Size: 5–6 cm (2 in) long, plus 0.5–1 cm (0.2–0.4 in) tail 3–4 cm (1–2 in) forearm length Habitat: Forest	DD Unknown
Dashe's nectar bat	H. dashe Velazco, Soto-Centeno, Fleck, Voss, & Simmons, 2017	Peru	Size: 4–6 cm (2 in) long, plus 0.5–2 cm (0.2–0.8 in) tail 3–4 cm (1–2 in) forearm length Habitat: Forest	NE Unknown
Patton's long-tongued bat	H. pattoni Woodman & Timm, 2006	Northwestern South America	Size: 5–6 cm (2 in) long, plus 0.5–1 cm (0.2–0.4 in) tail 3–4 cm (1–2 in) forearm length Habitat: Forest	DD Unknown
Thomas's nectar bat	H. thomasi J. A. Allen, 1904	Central America and northern South America	Size: 4–6 cm (2 in) long, plus 0–2 cm (0.0–0.8 in) tail 2–4 cm (1–2 in) forearm length Habitat: Forest and caves	LC Unknown

Genus Lionycteris – Thomas, 1913 – one species
Common name	Scientific name and subspecies	Range	Size and ecology	IUCN status and estimated population
Chestnut long-tongued bat	L. spurrelli Thomas, 1913	Central America and northern South America	Size: 4–7 cm (2–3 in) long, plus 0.5–1 cm (0.2–0.4 in) tail 3–4 cm (1–2 in) forearm length Habitat: Forest, savanna, and caves	LC Unknown

Genus Lonchophylla – Thomas, 1903 – thirteen species
Common name	Scientific name and subspecies	Range	Size and ecology	IUCN status and estimated population
Bokermann's nectar bat	L. bokermanni Sazima, Vizotto, & Taddei, 1978	Southeastern South America	Size: 5–7 cm (2–3 in) long, plus 1–2 cm (0–1 in) tail 3–5 cm (1–2 in) forearm length Habitat: Forest and savanna	EN Unknown
Caatinga nectar bat	L. inexpectata Moratelli & Dias, 2015	Eastern Brazil	Size: Unknown length 3–4 cm (1–2 in) forearm length Habitat: Caves and forest	NE Unknown
Central American nectar bat	L. concava Goldman, 1914	Central America and northwestern South America	Size: 5–6 cm (2 in) long, plus 0.5–2 cm (0.2–0.8 in) tail 3–4 cm (1–2 in) forearm length Habitat: Forest	LC Unknown
Chocoan long-tongued bat	L. chocoana Dávalos, 2004	Northwestern South America	Size: 6–8 cm (2–3 in) long, plus 0.5–2 cm (0.2–0.8 in) tail 4–5 cm (2 in) forearm length Habitat: Forest	DD Unknown
Dekeyser's nectar bat	L. dekeyseri Taddei, Vizotto, & Sazima, 1983	Eastern South America	Size: 4–7 cm (2–3 in) long, plus 0.5–1 cm (0.2–0.4 in) tail 3–4 cm (1–2 in) forearm length Habitat: Savanna and caves	EN 600
Eastern Cordilleran nectar bat	L. orienticollina Dávalos & Corthals, 2008	Northwestern South America	Size: 6–8 cm (2–3 in) long, plus 0.5–2 cm (0.2–0.8 in) tail 4–5 cm (2 in) forearm length Habitat: Forest	DD Unknown
Goldman's nectar bat	L. mordax Thomas, 1903	Central America and northwestern and eastern South America	Size: 5–6 cm (2 in) long, plus 0.5–2 cm (0.2–0.8 in) tail 3–4 cm (1–2 in) forearm length Habitat: Caves and forest	NT Unknown
Handley's nectar bat	L. handleyi Hill, 1980	Western South America	Size: 6–9 cm (2–4 in) long, plus 0.5–1 cm (0.2–0.4 in) tail 4–5 cm (2 in) forearm length Habitat: Forest and caves	LC Unknown
Orange nectar bat	L. robusta Miller, 1912	Central America and northwestern South America	Size: 5–8 cm (2–3 in) long, plus 0.5–2 cm (0.2–0.8 in) tail 3–5 cm (1–2 in) forearm length Habitat: Forest and caves	LC Unknown
Orcés's long-tongued bat	L. orcesi Viteri & Gardner, 2005	Ecuador	Size: About 6 cm (2 in) long, plus about 1 cm (0.4 in) tail about 5 cm (2 in) forearm length Habitat: Forest	DD Unknown
Pacific Forest long-tongued bat	L. fornicata Woodman, 2007	Northwestern South America	Size: 5–7 cm (2–3 in) long, plus 0.5–2 cm (0.2–0.8 in) tail 3–4 cm (1–2 in) forearm length Habitat: Forest	DD Unknown
Peracchi's nectar bat	L. peracchii Días, Esbérard & Moratelli, 2013	Eastern South America	Size: Unknown length 3–4 cm (1–2 in) forearm length Habitat: Forest	LC Unknown
Western nectar bat	L. hesperia G. M. Allen, 1908	Western South America	Size: 5–7 cm (2–3 in) long, plus 0.5–2 cm (0.2–0.8 in) tail 3–5 cm (1–2 in) forearm length Habitat: Unknown	NT Unknown

=== Subfamily Lonchorhininae ===
Genus Lonchorhina – Tomes, 1863 – six species
Common name	Scientific name and subspecies	Range	Size and ecology	IUCN status and estimated population
Fernandez's sword-nosed bat	L. fernandezi Ochoa & Ibáñez, 1982	Venezuela	Size: 5–6 cm (2 in) long, plus 4–5 cm (2 in) tail 4–5 cm (2 in) forearm length Habitat: Savanna and caves	EN 150
Marinkelle's sword-nosed bat	L. marinkellei Camacho & Cadena, 1978	Colombia	Size: 6–8 cm (2–3 in) long, plus 5–7 cm (2–3 in) tail 5–7 cm (2–3 in) forearm length Habitat: Grassland and caves	VU Unknown
Mother Mara's sword-nosed bat	L. mankomara Mantilla-Meluk & Montenegro, 2016	Colombia	Size: Unknown Habitat: Grassland and caves	NE Unknown
Northern sword-nosed bat	L. inusitata Handley & Ochoa, 1997	Northern South America	Size: 5–8 cm (2–3 in) long, plus 5–7 cm (2–3 in) tail 5–6 cm (2 in) forearm length Habitat: Forest and caves	DD Unknown
Orinoco sword-nosed bat	L. orinocensis Linares & Ojasti, 1971	Northwestern South America	Size: 4–6 cm (2 in) long, plus 4–6 cm (2 in) tail 4–5 cm (2 in) forearm length Habitat: Forest, savanna, rocky areas, and caves	VU Unknown
Tomes's sword-nosed bat	L. aurita Tomes, 1863 Two subspecies: L. a. aurita; L. a. occidentalis	Mexico, Central America, and South America	Size: 5–7 cm (2–3 in) long, plus 4–7 cm (2–3 in) tail 4–6 cm (2 in) forearm length Habitat: Forest and caves	LC Unknown

=== Subfamily Macrotinae ===
Genus Macrotus – Gray, 1843 – two species
Common name	Scientific name and subspecies	Range	Size and ecology	IUCN status and estimated population
California leaf-nosed bat	M. californicus Baird, 1858	Western United States and Mexico	Size: 8–11 cm (3–4 in) long, plus 2–5 cm (1–2 in) tail 4–6 cm (2 in) forearm length Habitat: Forest, shrubland, and caves	LC Unknown
Waterhouse's leaf-nosed bat	M. waterhousii Gray, 1843 Six subspecies: M. w. bulleri; M. w. compressus; M. w. jamaicensis; M. w. mexicanus; M. w. minor; M. w. waterhousii	Mexico, Central America, and Caribbean	Size: 8–11 cm (3–4 in) long, plus 2–5 cm (1–2 in) tail 4–6 cm (2 in) forearm length Habitat: Forest and caves	LC Unknown

=== Subfamily Micronycterinae ===
Genus Lampronycteris – Sanborn, 1949 – one species
Common name	Scientific name and subspecies	Range	Size and ecology	IUCN status and estimated population
Yellow-throated big-eared bat	L. brachyotis (Dobson, 1878)	Mexico, Central America, and South America	Size: 5–7 cm (2–3 in) long, plus 0.5–2 cm (0.2–0.8 in) tail 3–5 cm (1–2 in) forearm length Habitat: Forest and caves	LC Unknown

Genus Micronycteris – Gray, 1866 – thirteen species
Common name	Scientific name and subspecies	Range	Size and ecology	IUCN status and estimated population
Brosset's big-eared bat	M. brosseti Simmons & Voss, 1998	Northern and southeastern South America	Size: 5–7 cm (2–3 in) long, plus 1–2 cm (0–1 in) tail 3–4 cm (1–2 in) forearm length Habitat: Forest	DD Unknown
Common big-eared bat	M. microtis Miller, 1898 Two subspecies: M. m. mexicana; M. m. microtis	Mexico, Central America, and northern South America	Size: 4–5 cm (2 in) long, plus 0.5–2 cm (0.2–0.8 in) tail 3–4 cm (1–2 in) forearm length Habitat: Forest and caves	LC Unknown
Giovanni's big-eared bat	M. giovanniae Baker & Fonseca, 2007	Ecuador	Size: About 6 cm (2 in) long, plus about 2 cm (1 in) tail About 4 cm (2 in) forearm length Habitat: Forest	DD Unknown
Hairy big-eared bat	M. hirsuta Peters, 1869	Central America and South America	Size: 5–8 cm (2–3 in) long, plus 1–2 cm (0–1 in) tail 4–5 cm (2 in) forearm length Habitat: Forest	LC Unknown
Little big-eared bat	M. megalotis Gray, 1842	South America	Size: 3–6 cm (1–2 in) long, plus 1–2 cm (0–1 in) tail 3–4 cm (1–2 in) forearm length Habitat: Forest and caves	LC Unknown
Matses's big-eared bat	M. matses Simmons, Voss, & Fleck, 2002	Peru	Size: 5–6 cm (2 in) long, plus 1–2 cm (0–1 in) tail 3–4 cm (1–2 in) forearm length Habitat: Unknown	DD Unknown
Saint Vincent big-eared bat	M. buriri Larsen, Siles, Pedersen, & Kwiecinski, 2011	Island of Saint Vincent	Size: 6–8 cm (2–3 in) long, plus 1–2 cm (0–1 in) tail 3–4 cm (1–2 in) forearm length Habitat: Forest	DD Unknown
Sanborn's big-eared bat	M. sanborni Simmons, 1996	South America	Size: 3–5 cm (1–2 in) long, plus 1–2 cm (0–1 in) tail 3–4 cm (1–2 in) forearm length Habitat: Forest and savanna	LC Unknown
Schmidts's big-eared bat	M. schmidtorum Sanborn, 1935	Mexico, Central America, and South America	Size: 5–7 cm (2–3 in) long, plus 1–2 cm (0.4–0.8 in) tail 3–4 cm (1–2 in) forearm length Habitat: Forest	LC Unknown
Simmons' big-eared bat	M. simmonsae Siles & Baker, 2020	Ecuador	Size: 4–6 cm (2 in) long, plus 1–2 cm (0.4–0.8 in) tail Unknown forearm length Habitat: Forest	NE Unknown
Three friends big-eared bat	M. tresamici Siles & Baker, 2020	Honduras and Costa Rica	Size: 4–6 cm (2 in) long, plus 0.5–2 cm (0.2–0.8 in) tail Unknown forearm length Habitat: Forest	NE Unknown
White-bellied big-eared bat	M. minuta Gervais, 1855	Central America and South America	Size: 4–6 cm (2 in) long, plus 0.5–2 cm (0.2–0.8 in) tail 3–4 cm (1–2 in) forearm length Habitat: Forest and caves	LC Unknown
Yates's big-eared bat	M. yatesi Siles, Brooks, Aranibar, Tarifa, Vargas, Rojas, & Baker, 2013	Central South America	Size: 4–6 cm (2 in) long, plus 0.5–1 cm (0.2–0.4 in) tail 3–4 cm (1–2 in) forearm length Habitat: Forest and savanna	DD Unknown

=== Subfamily Phyllostominae ===
Genus Chrotopterus – Peters, 1865 – one species
Common name	Scientific name and subspecies	Range	Size and ecology	IUCN status and estimated population
Big-eared woolly bat	C. auritus Peters, 1856	Mexico, Central America, and South America	Size: 10–13 cm (4–5 in) long, plus 0.5–2 cm (0.2–0.8 in) tail 7–9 cm (3–4 in) forearm length Habitat: Forest and caves	LC Unknown

Genus Gardnerycteris – Hurtado & Pacheco, 2014 – three species
Common name	Scientific name and subspecies	Range	Size and ecology	IUCN status and estimated population
Keenan's hairy-nosed bat	G. keenani Handley, 1960	Mexico, Central America, and Northwestern South America	Size: 4–7 cm (2–3 in) long, plus 2–3 cm (1 in) tail 4–6 cm (2 in) forearm length Habitat: Forest and savanna	NE Unknown
Koepcke's hairy-nosed bat	G. koepckeae Gardner & Patton, 1972	Peru	Size: About 6 cm (2 in) long, plus about 2 cm (1 in) tail 4–6 cm (2 in) forearm length Habitat: Forest	DD Unknown
Striped hairy-nosed bat	G. crenulatum Geoffroy, 1810	Mexico, Central America, and South America	Size: 8–10 cm (3–4 in) long, plus 2–3 cm (1 in) tail 4–6 cm (2 in) forearm length Habitat: Forest and savanna	LC Unknown

Genus Lophostoma – d'Orbigny, 1836 – eight species
Common name	Scientific name and subspecies	Range	Size and ecology	IUCN status and estimated population
Carriker's round-eared bat	L. carrikeri J. A. Allen, 1910	Northern South America	Size: 6–8 cm (2–3 in) long, plus 1–2 cm (0–1 in) tail 4–5 cm (2 in) forearm length Habitat: Forest and savanna	LC Unknown
Davis's round-eared bat	L. evotis Davis & Carter, 1978	Southern Mexico and Central America	Size: 4–7 cm (2–3 in) long, plus 1–2 cm (0–1 in) tail 4–6 cm (2 in) forearm length Habitat: Forest	LC Unknown
Kalko's round-eared bat	L. kalkoae Velazco & Gardner, 2012	Panama	Size: Unknown, plus 0.5–1 cm (0.2–0.4 in) tail 4–5 cm (2 in) forearm length Habitat: Forest	DD Unknown
Mesoamerican round-eared bat	L. nicaraguae Goodwin, 1942	Mexico, Central America, and northwestern South America	Size: Unknown Habitat: Forest	NE Unknown
Pygmy round-eared bat	L. brasiliense Peters, 1866	Mexico, Central America, and South America	Size: 4–7 cm (2–3 in) long, plus 0.5–2 cm (0.2–0.8 in) tail 3–4 cm (1–2 in) forearm length Habitat: Forest and savanna	LC Unknown
Schultz's round-eared bat	L. schulzi (Genoways & Williams, 1980)	Northern South America	Size: 6–7 cm (2–3 in) long, plus 1–2 cm (0–1 in) tail 4–5 cm (2 in) forearm length Habitat: Forest	LC Unknown
Western round-eared bat	L. occidentale Davis & Carter, 1978	Northwestern South America	Size: 7–8 cm (3 in) long, plus 1–3 cm (0–1 in) tail 5–6 cm (2 in) forearm length Habitat: Forest	NT Unknown
White-throated round-eared bat	L. silvicolum d'Orbigny, 1863 Three subspecies: L. s. centralis; L. s. laephotis; L. s. silvicolum	Central America and South America	Size: 6–9 cm (2–4 in) long, plus 1–3 cm (0–1 in) tail 5–6 cm (2 in) forearm length Habitat: Forest	LC Unknown

Genus Macrophyllum – Gray, 1838 – one species
Common name	Scientific name and subspecies	Range	Size and ecology	IUCN status and estimated population
Long-legged bat	M. macrophyllum (Schinz, 1821)	Mexico, Central America, and South America	Size: 4–6 cm (2 in) long, plus 3–5 cm (1–2 in) tail 3–4 cm (1–2 in) forearm length Habitat: Forest	LC Unknown

Genus Mimon – Gray, 1847 – two species
Common name	Scientific name and subspecies	Range	Size and ecology	IUCN status and estimated population
Cozumelan golden bat	M. cozumelae Goldman, 1914	Mexico, Central America, and northwestern South America	Size: 8–10 cm (3–4 in) long, plus 2–3 cm (1 in) tail 5–6 cm (2 in) forearm length Habitat: Forest and caves	LC Unknown
Golden bat	M. bennettii Gray, 1838	Northern and southeastern South America	Size: 6–8 cm (2–3 in) long, plus 1–3 cm (0–1 in) tail 5–7 cm (2–3 in) forearm length Habitat: Caves, savanna, and forest	LC Unknown

Genus Phylloderma – Peters, 1865 – two species
Common name	Scientific name and subspecies	Range	Size and ecology	IUCN status and estimated population
Northern pale-faced bat	P. septentrionale Goodwin, 1940	Mexico and Central America	Size: 8–11 cm (3–4 in) long, plus 1–3 cm (0–1 in) tail 6–9 cm (2–4 in) forearm length Habitat: Forest, savanna, and inland wetlands	NE Unknown
Pale-faced bat	P. stenops Peters, 1865 Two subspecies: P. s. boliviensis; P. s. stenops	Mexico, Central America, and South America	Size: 8–11 cm (3–4 in) long, plus 1–3 cm (0–1 in) tail 6–9 cm (2–4 in) forearm length Habitat: Forest, savanna, and inland wetlands	LC Unknown

Genus Phyllostomus – Lacépède, 1799 – four species
Common name	Scientific name and subspecies	Range	Size and ecology	IUCN status and estimated population
Greater spear-nosed bat	P. hastatus (Pallas, 1767) Two subspecies: P. h. hastatus; P. h. panamensis	Central America and South America	Size: 9–13 cm (4–5 in) long, plus 1–4 cm (0–2 in) tail 7–10 cm (3–4 in) forearm length Habitat: Forest and savanna	LC Unknown
Guianan spear-nosed bat	P. latifolius Thomas, 1901	Northern South America	Size: 7–9 cm (3–4 in) long, plus 1–2 cm (0–1 in) tail 5–6 cm (2 in) forearm length Habitat: Caves	LC Unknown
Lesser spear-nosed bat	P. elongatus Geoffroy, 1810	South America	Size: 6–10 cm (2–4 in) long, plus 1–3 cm (0–1 in) tail 5–8 cm (2–3 in) forearm length Habitat: Forest and caves	LC Unknown
Pale spear-nosed bat	P. discolor Wagner, 1843 Two subspecies: P. d. discolor; P. d. verrucosus	Mexico, Central America, and South America	Size: 6–10 cm (2–4 in) long, plus 1–2 cm (0–1 in) tail 6–7 cm (2–3 in) forearm length Habitat: Forest, caves, and savanna	LC Unknown

Genus Tonatia – Gray, 1827 – three species
Common name	Scientific name and subspecies	Range	Size and ecology	IUCN status and estimated population
Baker's round-eared bat	T. bakeri Williams, Willig, & Reid, 1995	Mexico, Central America, and northwestern South America	Size: About 7 cm (3 in) long, plus 0.5–2.5 cm (0.2–1.0 in) tail 5–7 cm (2–3 in) forearm length Habitat: Forest	NE Unknown
Greater round-eared bat	T. bidens Spix, 1823	Eastern South America	Size: 6–9 cm (2–4 in) long, plus 1–2 cm (0.4–0.8 in) tail 4–6 cm (2 in) forearm length Habitat: Forest	DD Unknown
Stripe-headed round-eared bat	T. saurophila Koopman & Williams, 1951 Two subspecies: T. s. maresi; T. s. saurophila	Mexico, Central America, and South America	Size: 6–9 cm (2–4 in) long, plus 1–2 cm (0.4–0.8 in) tail 4–6 cm (2 in) forearm length Habitat: Forest	LC Unknown

Genus Trachops – Gray, 1847 – three species
Common name	Scientific name and subspecies	Range	Size and ecology	IUCN status and estimated population
Coffin's fringe-lipped bat	T. coffini Goldman, 1925	Mexico and Central America (in blue)	Size: 8–11 cm (3–4 in) long, plus 1–2 cm (0.4–0.8 in) tail 4–7 cm (2–3 in) forearm length Habitat: Forest and caves	NE Unknown
Fringe-lipped bat	T. cirrhosus (Spix, 1823)	Central America and South America (in red)	Size: 8–11 cm (3–4 in) long, plus 1–2 cm (0.4–0.8 in) tail 4–7 cm (2–3 in) forearm length Habitat: Forest and caves	LC Unknown
Ehrhardt's fringe-lipped bat	T. ehrhardti Felten, 1956	Eastern Brazil (in green)	Size: Unknown length 5–6 cm (2 in) forearm length Habitat: Forest and caves	NE Unknown

Genus Vampyrum – Rafinesque, 1815 – one species
Common name	Scientific name and subspecies	Range	Size and ecology	IUCN status and estimated population
Spectral bat	V. spectrum (Linnaeus, 1758)	Mexico, Central America, and South America	Size: 12–16 cm (5–6 in) long, with no tail 9–11 cm (4 in) forearm length Habitat: Forest	NT Unknown

=== Subfamily Rhinophyllinae ===
Genus Rhinophylla – Peters, 1865 – three species
Common name	Scientific name and subspecies	Range	Size and ecology	IUCN status and estimated population
Dwarf little fruit bat	R. pumilio Peters, 1865	Northern South America	Size: 4–6 cm (2 in) long, with no tail 2–4 cm (1–2 in) forearm length Habitat: Forest	LC Unknown
Fischer's little fruit bat	R. fischerae Carter, 1966	Northern South America	Size: 4–5 cm (2 in) long, with no tail 2–4 cm (1–2 in) forearm length Habitat: Forest	LC Unknown
Hairy little fruit bat	R. alethina Handley, 1966	Northwestern South America	Size: 4–6 cm (2 in) long, with no tail 3–4 cm (1–2 in) forearm length Habitat: Forest	NT Unknown

=== Subfamily Stenodermatinae ===
Genus Ametrida – Gray, 1847 – one species
Common name	Scientific name and subspecies	Range	Size and ecology	IUCN status and estimated population
Little white-shouldered bat	A. centurio Gray, 1847	Central America and northern South America	Size: 3–6 cm (1–2 in) long, with no tail 2–4 cm (1–2 in) forearm length Habitat: Forest	LC Unknown

Genus Ardops – Miller, 1906 – one species
Common name	Scientific name and subspecies	Range	Size and ecology	IUCN status and estimated population
Tree bat	A. nichollsi (Thomas, 1891) Five subspecies: A. n. annectens; A. n. koopmani; A. n. luciae; A. n. montserratensis; A. n. nichollsi	Caribbean	Size: 6–7 cm (2–3 in) long, with no tail 4–5 cm (2 in) forearm length Habitat: Forest	LC Unknown

Genus Ariteus – Gray, 1838 – one species
Common name	Scientific name and subspecies	Range	Size and ecology	IUCN status and estimated population
Jamaican fig-eating bat	A. flavescens Gray, 1831	Jamaica	Size: 5–7 cm (2–3 in) long, with no tail 3–5 cm (1–2 in) forearm length Habitat: Forest	LC Unknown

Genus Artibeus – Leach, 1821 – thirteen species
Common name	Scientific name and subspecies	Range	Size and ecology	IUCN status and estimated population
Brown fruit-eating bat	A. concolor Peters, 1865	Northern South America	Size: 5–7 cm (2–3 in) long, with no tail 4–5 cm (2 in) forearm length Habitat: Forest	LC Unknown
Common fruit-eating bat	A. intermedius J. A. Allen, 1897	Mexico and Central America	Size: 7–11 cm (3–4 in) long, with no tail 5–7 cm (2–3 in) forearm length Habitat: Forest	NE Unknown
Dark fruit-eating bat	A. obscurus Schinz, 1821	South America	Size: 7–9 cm (3–4 in) long, with no tail 5–7 cm (2–3 in) forearm length Habitat: Forest and savanna	LC Unknown
Ecuadorian fruit-eating bat	A. aequatorialis K. Andersen, 1906	Northwestern South America	Size: 7–10 cm (3–4 in) long, with no tail 6–8 cm (2–3 in) forearm length Habitat: Forest	LC Unknown
Flat-faced fruit-eating bat	A. planirostris (Spix, 1823)	South America	Size: 6–10 cm (2–4 in) long, with no tail 6–7 cm (2–3 in) forearm length Habitat: Forest	LC Unknown
Fraternal fruit-eating bat	A. fraterculus Anthony, 1924	Western South America	Size: 6–8 cm (2–3 in) long, with no tail 5–6 cm (2 in) forearm length Habitat: Forest	LC Unknown
Fringed fruit-eating bat	A. fimbriatus Gray, 1838	Eastern South America	Size: 8–10 cm (3–4 in) long, with no tail 6–8 cm (2–3 in) forearm length Habitat: Forest	LC Unknown
Great fruit-eating bat	A. lituratus Olfers, 1818 Three subspecies: A. l. koopmani; A. l. lituratus; A. l. palmarum	Mexico, Central America, and South America	Size: 7–11 cm (3–4 in) long, with no tail 5–7 cm (2–3 in) forearm length Habitat: Forest	LC Unknown
Hairy fruit-eating bat	A. hirsutus K. Andersen, 1906	Mexico	Size: 6–9 cm (2–4 in) long, with no tail 5–6 cm (2 in) forearm length Habitat: Forest and caves	LC Unknown
Honduran fruit-eating bat	A. inopinatus Davis & Carter, 1964	Central America	Size: Unknown length, with no tail 4–6 cm (2 in) forearm length Habitat: Forest and savanna	DD Unknown
Jamaican fruit bat	A. jamaicensis Leach, 1821 Ten subspecies: A. j. fallax; A. j. grenadensis; A. j. hercules; A. j. jamaicensis; A. j. parvipes; A. j. paulus; A. j. richardsoni; A. j. trinitatis; A. j. triomylus; A. j. yucatanicus	Mexico, Caribbean, Central America, and northern South America	Size: 7–10 cm (3–4 in) long, with no tail 5–7 cm (2–3 in) forearm length Habitat: Forest, rocky areas, and caves	LC Unknown
Large fruit-eating bat	A. amplus Handley, 1987	Northern South America	Size: 8–11 cm (3–4 in) long, with no tail 6–8 cm (2–3 in) forearm length Habitat: Forest	LC Unknown
Schwartz's fruit-eating bat	A. schwartzi Jones, 1978	Caribbean and northern South America	Size: 8–10 cm (3–4 in) long, with no tail 6–7 cm (2–3 in) forearm length Habitat: Forest	DD Unknown

Genus Centurio – Gray, 1842 – one species
Common name	Scientific name and subspecies	Range	Size and ecology	IUCN status and estimated population
Wrinkle-faced bat	C. senex Gray, 1842 Two subspecies: C. s. greenhalli; C. s. senex	Mexico, Central America, and northern South America	Size: 5–7 cm (2–3 in) long, with no tail 4–5 cm (2 in) forearm length Habitat: Forest	LC Unknown

Genus Chiroderma – Peters, 1860 – seven species
Common name	Scientific name and subspecies	Range	Size and ecology	IUCN status and estimated population
Brazilian big-eyed bat	C. doriae Thomas, 1891	Eastern South America	Size: 6–8 cm (2–3 in) long, with no tail 4–6 cm (2 in) forearm length Habitat: Forest	LC Unknown
Fierce big-eyed bat	C. gorgasi Handley, 1960	Northwestern South America	Size: 5–6 cm (2 in) long, with no tail 3–4 cm (1–2 in) forearm length Habitat: Forest and caves	NE Unknown
Guadeloupe big-eyed bat	C. improvisum Baker & Genoways, 1976	Caribbean	Size: 8–9 cm (3–4 in) long, with no tail 5–6 cm (2 in) forearm length Habitat: Forest	EN Unknown
Hairy big-eyed bat	C. villosum Peters, 1860 Two subspecies: C. v. jesupi; C. v. villosum	Mexico, Central America, and northern South America	Size: 5–8 cm (2–3 in) long, with no tail 4–6 cm (2 in) forearm length Habitat: Forest	LC Unknown
Little big-eyed bat	C. trinitatum Goodwin, 1958	Central America and northern South America	Size: 5–7 cm (2–3 in) long, with no tail 3–5 cm (1–2 in) forearm length Habitat: Forest and caves	LC Unknown
Mexican big-eyed bat	C. scopaeum Handley, 1960	Mexico	Size: 6–8 cm (2–3 in) long, with no tail 4–5 cm (2 in) long forearm length Habitat: Forest and savanna	NE Unknown
Salvin's big-eyed bat	C. salvini Dobson, 1878 Two subspecies: C. s. salvini; C. s. scopaeum	Mexico, Central America, and northern South America	Size: 6–9 cm (2–4 in) long, with no tail 4–6 cm (2 in) forearm length Habitat: Forest and savanna	LC Unknown

Genus Dermanura – Gervais, 1856 – eleven species
Common name	Scientific name and subspecies	Range	Size and ecology	IUCN status and estimated population
Andersen's fruit-eating bat	D. anderseni Osgood, 1916	Northern South America	Size: 4–6 cm (2 in) long, with no tail 3–4 cm (1–2 in) forearm length Habitat: Forest	LC Unknown
Aztec fruit-eating bat	D. aztecus K. Andersen, 1906 Three subspecies: D. a. aztecus; D. a. major; D. a. minor	Mexico and Central America	Size: 5–8 cm (2–3 in) long, with no tail 4–5 cm (2 in) forearm length Habitat: Forest	LC Unknown
Bogota fruit-eating bat	D. bogotensis K. Andersen, 1906	Northern South America	Size: 4–7 cm (2–3 in) long, with no tail 3–5 cm (1–2 in) forearm length Habitat: Forest	LC Unknown
Gervais's fruit-eating bat	D. cinereus Gervais, 1856	Eastern and western South America	Size: 4–6 cm (2 in) long, with no tail 3–5 cm (1–2 in) forearm length Habitat: Forest and savanna	LC Unknown
Gnome fruit-eating bat	D. gnomus Handley, 1987	Northern South America	Size: 4–6 cm (2 in) long, with no tail 3–4 cm (1–2 in) forearm length Habitat: Forest	LC Unknown
Little fruit-eating bat	D. rava Miller, 1902	Central America and northwestern South America	Size: 4–7 cm (2–3 in) long, with no tail 3–5 cm (1–2 in) forearm length Habitat: Forest	LC Unknown
Pygmy fruit-eating bat	D. phaeotis Miller, 1902 Three subspecies: D. p. nanus; D. p. palatinus; D. p. phaeotis	Mexico, Central America, and northern South America	Size: 5–6 cm (2 in) long, with no tail 3–5 cm (1–2 in) forearm length Habitat: Forest	LC Unknown
Rosenberg's fruit-eating bat	D. rosenbergi Thomas, 1897	Northwestern South America	Size: 5–6 cm (2 in) long, with no tail 3–5 cm (1–2 in) forearm length Habitat: Forest	DD Unknown
Silver fruit-eating bat	D. glaucus Thomas, 1893	Northwestern South America	Size: 4–7 cm (2–3 in) long, with no tail 3–5 cm (1–2 in) forearm length Habitat: Forest	LC Unknown
Thomas's fruit-eating bat	D. watsoni (Thomas, 1901)	Mexico, Central America, and northwestern South America	Size: 5–6 cm (2 in) long, with no tail 3–5 cm (1–2 in) forearm length Habitat: Forest	LC Unknown
Toltec fruit-eating bat	D. toltecus Saussure, 1860 Two subspecies: D. t. hesperus; D. t. toltecus	Mexico and Central America	Size: 5–7 cm (2–3 in) long, with no tail 3–5 cm (1–2 in) forearm length Habitat: Forest and caves	LC Unknown

Genus Ectophylla – H. Allen, 1892 – one species
Common name	Scientific name and subspecies	Range	Size and ecology	IUCN status and estimated population
Honduran white bat	E. alba H. Allen, 1892	Central America	Size: 3–5 cm (1–2 in) long, with no tail 2–3 cm (1 in) forearm length Habitat: Forest	NT Unknown

Genus Enchisthenes – K. Andersen, 1906 – one species
Common name	Scientific name and subspecies	Range	Size and ecology	IUCN status and estimated population
Velvety fruit-eating bat	E. hartii (Thomas, 1892)	Mexico, Central America, and northern South America	Size: 5–7 cm (2–3 in) long, with no tail 3–5 cm (1–2 in) forearm length Habitat: Forest	LC Unknown

Genus Mesophylla – Thomas, 1901 – one species
Common name	Scientific name and subspecies	Range	Size and ecology	IUCN status and estimated population
MacConnell's bat	M. macconnelli Thomas, 1901 Two subspecies: M. m. flavescens; M. m. macconnelli	Central America and northern South America	Size: 4–5 cm (2 in) long, with no tail 2–4 cm (1–2 in) forearm length Habitat: Forest	LC Unknown

Genus Phyllops – Peters, 1865 – one species
Common name	Scientific name and subspecies	Range	Size and ecology	IUCN status and estimated population
Cuban fig-eating bat	P. falcatus (Gray, 1839) Two subspecies: P. f. falcatus; P. f. haitiensis	Caribbean	Size: 5–7 cm (2–3 in) long, with no tail 4–5 cm (2 in) forearm length Habitat: Forest	LC Unknown

Genus Platyrrhinus – Saussure, 1860 – nineteen species
Common name	Scientific name and subspecies	Range	Size and ecology	IUCN status and estimated population
Alberico's broad-nosed bat	P. albericoi Velazco, 2005	Northwestern South America	Size: 9–10 cm (4 in) long, with no tail 5–7 cm (2–3 in) forearm length Habitat: Forest	LC Unknown
Brown-bellied broad-nosed bat	P. fusciventris Velazco, Gardner, & Patterson, 2010	Northern South America	Size: 5–7 cm (2–3 in) long, with no tail 3–5 cm (1–2 in) forearm length Habitat: Forest	LC Unknown
Buffy broad-nosed bat	P. infuscus Peters, 1880	Northwestern South America	Size: 7–11 cm (3–4 in) long, with no tail 5–7 cm (2–3 in) forearm length Habitat: Forest and caves	LC Unknown
Darien broad-nosed bat	P. aquilus (Handley & Ferris, 1972)	Central America and northwestern South America	Size: 7–8 cm (3 in) long, with no tail 4–5 cm (2 in) forearm length Habitat: Forest	DD Unknown
Eldorado broad-nosed bat	P. aurarius Handley & Ferris, 1972	Northern South America	Size: 7–9 cm (3–4 in) long, with no tail 4–6 cm (2 in) forearm length Habitat: Forest	LC Unknown
Greater broad-nosed bat	P. vittatus Peters, 1860	Central America and northwestern South America	Size: About 10 cm (4 in) long, with no tail 5–7 cm (2–3 in) forearm length Habitat: Forest	LC Unknown
Guianan broad-nosed bat	P. guianensis Velazco & Lim, 2014	Guyana & Suriname	Size: 5–6 cm (2 in) long, with no tail 3–5 cm (1–2 in) forearm length Habitat: Forest, savanna, and caves	NE Unknown
Heller's broad-nosed bat	P. helleri Peters, 1866	Mexico, Central America, and South America	Size: 5–7 cm (2–3 in) long, with no tail 3–5 cm (1–2 in) forearm length Habitat: Forest, savanna, and caves	LC Unknown
Incan broad-nosed bat	P. incarum Thomas, 1912	Northern South America	Size: 5–7 cm (2–3 in) long, with no tail 3–5 cm (1–2 in) forearm length Habitat: Forest	LC Unknown
Ismael's broad-nosed bat	P. ismaeli Velazco, 2005	Northwestern South America	Size: 7–9 cm (3–4 in) long, with no tail 5–6 cm (2 in) forearm length Habitat: Forest and caves	NT Unknown
Matapalo broad-nosed bat	P. matapalensis Velazco, 2005	Northwestern South America	Size: 5–7 cm (2–3 in) long, with no tail 3–4 cm (1–2 in) forearm length Habitat: Forest	NT Unknown
Quechua broad-nosed bat	P. masu Velazco, 2005	Western South America	Size: 7–9 cm (3–4 in) long, with no tail 4–6 cm (2 in) forearm length Habitat: Forest	LC Unknown
Recife broad-nosed bat	P. recifinus Thomas, 1901	Eastern South America	Size: 5–7 cm (2–3 in) long, with no tail 3–5 cm (1–2 in) forearm length Habitat: Forest, savanna, and caves	LC Unknown
Shadowy broad-nosed bat	P. umbratus (Lyon, 1902) Three subspecies: P. u. aquilius; P. u. oratus; P. u. umbratus	Northwestern South America	Size: 6–8 cm (2–3 in) long, with no tail 4–5 cm (2 in) forearm length Habitat: Unknown	DD Unknown
Short-headed broad-nosed bat	P. brachycephalus Rouk & Carter, 1972	Northern South America	Size: 5–7 cm (2–3 in) long, with no tail 3–5 cm (1–2 in) forearm length Habitat: Forest and caves	LC Unknown
Slender broad-nosed bat	P. angustirostris Velazco, Gardner, & Patterson, 2010	Northwestern South America	Size: 5–6 cm (2 in) long, with no tail 3–4 cm (1–2 in) forearm length Habitat: Forest	LC Unknown
Thomas's broad-nosed bat	P. dorsalis (Thomas, 1900)	Northwestern South America	Size: 7–8 cm (3 in) long, with no tail 4–5 cm (2 in) forearm length Habitat: Forest	LC Unknown
Western broad-nosed bat	P. nitelinea Velazco & Gardner, 2009	Colombia and Ecuador	Size: 8–9 cm (3–4 in) long, with no tail 5–6 cm (2 in) forearm length Habitat: Forest	DD Unknown
White-lined broad-nosed bat	P. lineatus Geoffroy, 1810 Two subspecies: P. l. lineatus; P. l. nigellus	Northern and eastern South America	Size: 6–8 cm (2–3 in) long, with no tail 4–5 cm (2 in) forearm length Habitat: Forest	LC Unknown

Genus Pygoderma – Peters, 1863 – one species
Common name	Scientific name and subspecies	Range	Size and ecology	IUCN status and estimated population
Ipanema bat	P. bilabiatum (Wagner, 1843) Two subspecies: P. b. bilabiatum; P. b. magna	Central and eastern South America	Size: Unknown length 3–5 cm (1–2 in) forearm length Habitat: Forest	LC Unknown

Genus Sphaeronycteris – Peters, 1882 – one species
Common name	Scientific name and subspecies	Range	Size and ecology	IUCN status and estimated population
Visored bat	S. toxophyllum Peters, 1882	Northern South America	Size: 5–9 cm (2–4 in) long, with no tail 3–5 cm (1–2 in) forearm length Habitat: Forest	LC Unknown

Genus Stenoderma – E. Geoffroy, 1818 – one species
Common name	Scientific name and subspecies	Range	Size and ecology	IUCN status and estimated population
Red fruit bat	S. rufum Desmarest, 1820 Two subspecies: S. r. darioi; S. r. rufum	Caribbean	Size: 6–7 cm (2–3 in) long, with no tail 4–6 cm (2 in) forearm length Habitat: Forest	NT Unknown

Genus Sturnira – Gray, 1842 – twenty-five species
Common name	Scientific name and subspecies	Range	Size and ecology	IUCN status and estimated population
Adriana's yellow-shouldered bat	S. adrianae Molinari, Bustos, Burneo, Camacho, Moreno, & Fermín, 2017	Colombia and Venezuela	Size: 5–9 cm (2–4 in) long, with no tail 4–6 cm (2 in) forearm length Habitat: Forest	NE Unknown
Aratathomas's yellow-shouldered bat	S. aratathomasi Peterson & Tamsitt, 1968	Northwestern South America	Size: 8–11 cm (3–4 in) long, with no tail 5–7 cm (2–3 in) forearm length Habitat: Forest	LC Unknown
Baker's yellow-shouldered bat	S. bakeri Velazco & Patterson, 2014	Northwestern South America	Size: 6–8 cm (2–3 in) long, with no tail 4–5 cm (2 in) forearm length Habitat: Forest	LC Unknown
Bidentate yellow-shouldered bat	S. bidens (Thomas, 1915)	Northwestern South America	Size: 6–7 cm (2–3 in) long, with no tail 3–5 cm (1–2 in) forearm length Habitat: Forest	LC Unknown
Boada's yellow-shouldered bat	S. boadai Yánez-Fernández, Marchán-Rivadeneira, Velazco, Burneo, Tinoco, & Camacho, 2023	Ecuador and Peru	Size: 4–5 cm (2 in) long, with no tail 3–4 cm (1–2 in) forearm length Habitat: Forest	NE Unknown
Bogotá yellow-shouldered bat	S. bogotensis Shamel, 1927	Northwestern South America	Size: 6–7 cm (2–3 in) long, with no tail 4–5 cm (2 in) forearm length Habitat: Forest	LC Unknown
Burton's yellow-shouldered bat	S. burtonlimi Velazco & Patterson, 2014	Central America	Size: 7–8 cm (3 in) long, with no tail about 4 cm (2 in) forearm length Habitat: Forest	DD Unknown
Choco yellow-shouldered bat	S. koopmanhilli McCarty, Viteri, & Alberico, 2006	Northwestern South America	Size: 7–8 cm (3 in) long, with no tail 4–6 cm (2 in) forearm length Habitat: Forest	DD Unknown
Greater yellow-shouldered bat	S. magna De la Torre, 1966	Northwestern South America	Size: 8–10 cm (3–4 in) long, with no tail 5–7 cm (2–3 in) forearm length Habitat: Forest	LC Unknown
Gianna's yellow-shouldered bat	S. giannae Velazco & Patterson, 2019	Northern South America	Size: 6–8 cm (2–3 in) long, with no tail 4–5 cm (2 in) forearm length Habitat: Forest	NE Unknown
Guadeloupe yellow-shouldered bat	S. angeli De la Torre, 1966	Caribbean	Size: 6–8 cm (2–3 in) long, with no tail 4–5 cm (2 in) forearm length Habitat: Forest	NT Unknown
Hairy yellow-shouldered bat	S. erythromos (Tschudi, 1844)	Western South America	Size: 5–6 cm (2 in) long, with no tail 3–5 cm (1–2 in) forearm length Habitat: Forest	LC Unknown
Highland yellow-shouldered bat	S. ludovici Anthony, 1924 Two subspecies: S. l. ludovici; S. l. occidentalis	Northwestern South America	Size: 6–8 cm (2–3 in) long, with no tail 4–5 cm (2 in) forearm length Habitat: Forest	LC Unknown
Honduran yellow-shouldered bat	S. hondurensis Goodwin, 1940	Mexico and Central America	Size: 6–7 cm (2–3 in) long, with no tail 4–5 cm (2 in) forearm length Habitat: Forest	LC Unknown
Lesser yellow-shouldered bat	S. nana Gardner & O'Neill, 1971	Peru and Ecuador	Size: 4–5 cm (2 in) long, with no tail 3–4 cm (1–2 in) forearm length Habitat: Forest	EN Unknown
Little yellow-shouldered bat	S. lilium Geoffroy, 1810 Five subspecies: S. l. lilium; S. l. luciae; S. l. serotinus; S. l. vulcanensis; S. l. zygomaticus	Mexico, Central America, and South America	Size: 5–8 cm (2–3 in) long, with no tail 3–5 cm (1–2 in) forearm length Habitat: Forest	LC Unknown
Louis's yellow-shouldered bat	S. luisi Davis, 1980	Central America and northwestern South America	Size: 6–8 cm (2–3 in) long, with no tail 4–5 cm (2 in) forearm length Habitat: Forest	LC Unknown
Mistratoan yellow-shouldered bat	S. mistratensis Vega & Cadena, 2000	Northwestern South America	Size: About 7 cm (3 in) long, with no tail about 4 cm (2 in) forearm length Habitat: Forest	DD Unknown
Northern yellow-shouldered bat	S. parvidens Goldman, 1917	Mexico and Central America	Size: 5–7 cm (2–3 in) long, with no tail 3–5 cm (1–2 in) forearm length Habitat: Forest	LC Unknown
Paulson's yellow-shouldered bat	S. paulsoni de la Torre & Schwartz, 1966	Caribbean	Size: 5–7 cm (2–3 in) long, with no tail 3–5 cm (1–2 in) forearm length Habitat: Forest	NT Unknown
Perla yellow-shouldered bat	S. perla Jarrín-Valladares & Kunz, 2011	Ecuador	Size: 5–7 cm (2–3 in) long, with no tail 4–6 cm (2 in) forearm length Habitat: Forest	DD Unknown
Soriano's yellow-shouldered bat	S. sorianoi Sánchez-Hernández, Romero-Almaraz, & Schnell, 2005	Northern and central South America	Size: 5–7 cm (2–3 in) long, with no tail 4–5 cm (2 in) forearm length Habitat: Unknown	DD Unknown
Talamancan yellow-shouldered bat	S. mordax Goodwin, 1938	Central America	Size: 7–8 cm (3 in) long, with no tail 4–5 cm (2 in) forearm length Habitat: Forest	LC Unknown
Tilda's yellow-shouldered bat	S. tildae De la Torre, 1959	South America	Size: 6–7 cm (2–3 in) long, with no tail 4–6 cm (2 in) forearm length Habitat: Forest	LC Unknown
Tschudi's yellow-shouldered bat	S. oporaphilum (Tschudi, 1844)	Western South America	Size: 6–8 cm (2–3 in) long, with no tail 4–5 cm (2 in) forearm length Habitat: Forest	LC Unknown

Genus Uroderma – Peters, 1865 – five species
Common name	Scientific name and subspecies	Range	Size and ecology	IUCN status and estimated population
Arcuate tent-making bat	U. convexum Lyon, 1902	Mexico, Central America, and northwestern South America (in orange and blue)	Size: 5–7 cm (2–3 in) long, with no tail 4–5 cm (2 in) long forearm length Habitat: Forest	NE Unknown
Baker's tent-making bat	U. bakeri Mantilla-Meluk, 2014	Colombia and Venezuela	Size: 5–6 cm (2 in) long, with no tail 3–4 cm (1–2 in) forearm length Habitat: Forest	NE Unknown
Brown tent-making bat	U. magnirostrum Davis, 1968	Mexico, Central America, and northern South America	Size: 5–7 cm (2–3 in) long, with no tail 3–5 cm (1–2 in) forearm length Habitat: Forest	LC Unknown
Davis's tent-making bat	U. davisi Baker & McDaniel, 1972	Mexico and Central America (in yellow)	Size: 5–7 cm (2–3 in) long, with no tail 4–5 cm (2 in) forearm length Habitat: Forest	NE Unknown
Tent-making bat	U. bilobatum Peters, 1866	South America (in red)	Size: 5–8 cm (2–3 in) long, with no tail 3–5 cm (1–2 in) forearm length Habitat: Forest and savanna	LC Unknown

Genus Vampyressa – Thomas, 1900 – six species
Common name	Scientific name and subspecies	Range	Size and ecology	IUCN status and estimated population
Kalko's yellow-eared bat	V. elisabethae Tavares, Gardner, Ramírez-Chaves, & Velazco, 2014	Panama	Size: 5–6 cm (2 in) long, with no tail 3–4 cm (1–2 in) forearm length Habitat: Forest	NE Unknown
Melissa's yellow-eared bat	V. melissa Thomas, 1926	Northwestern South America	Size: 5–7 cm (2–3 in) long, with no tail 3–4 cm (1–2 in) forearm length Habitat: Forest	VU Unknown
Northern little yellow-eared bat	V. thyone Thomas, 1909	Mexico, Central America, and northern South America	Size: 4–6 cm (2 in) long, with no tail 2–4 cm (1–2 in) forearm length Habitat: Forest	LC Unknown
Southern little yellow-eared bat	V. pusilla Thomas, 1900	Southeastern South America	Size: 5–6 cm (2 in) long, with no tail 2–4 cm (1–2 in) forearm length Habitat: Unknown	DD Unknown
Villa's yellow-eared bat	V. villai Garbino, Hernández-Canchola, León-Paniagua, & Tavares, 2024	Mexico	Size: 4–6 cm (2 in) long, with no tail 2–4 cm (1–2 in) forearm length Habitat: Forest	NE Unknown
Vorágine's yellow-eared bat	V. voragine Morales-Martínez, Rodríguez-Posada, & Ramírez-Chaves, 2021	Colombia	Size: 5–6 cm (2 in) long, with no tail 3–4 cm (1–2 in) forearm length Habitat: Forest	NE Unknown

Genus Vampyriscus – Thomas, 1900 – three species
Common name	Scientific name and subspecies	Range	Size and ecology	IUCN status and estimated population
Bidentate yellow-eared bat	V. bidens Dobson, 1878	Northern South America	Size: 5–6 cm (2 in) long, with no tail 3–4 cm (1–2 in) forearm length Habitat: Forest	LC Unknown
Brock's yellow-eared bat	V. brocki Peterson, 1968	Northern South America	Size: 4–6 cm (2 in) long, with no tail 3–4 cm (1–2 in) forearm length Habitat: Forest	LC Unknown
Striped yellow-eared bat	V. nymphaea Thomas, 1909	Central America and northwestern South America	Size: 4–7 cm (2–3 in) long, with no tail 3–4 cm (1–2 in) forearm length Habitat: Forest	LC Unknown

Genus Vampyrodes – Thomas, 1900 – two species
Common name	Scientific name and subspecies	Range	Size and ecology	IUCN status and estimated population
Great stripe-faced bat	V. caraccioli Thomas, 1889	Northern South America	Size: 7–8 cm (3 in) long, with no tail 4–6 cm (2 in) forearm length Habitat: Forest	LC Unknown
Greater stripe-faced bat	V. major G. M. Allen, 1908	Central America and northwestern South America	Size: 7–9 cm (3–4 in) long, with no tail 4–6 cm (2 in) forearm length Habitat: Forest	LC Unknown

== Sources ==
- Chernasky, Amy; Motis, Anna; Burgin, Connor, eds. (2023). All the Mammals of the World. Lynx Nature Books. ISBN 978-84-16728-66-4.
- Simmons, Nancy B. (2005). Wilson, Don E.; Reeder, DeeAnn M. (eds.). Mammal Species of the World. Vol. 1 (3rd ed.). Johns Hopkins University Press. ISBN 978-0-8018-8221-0.
- Nowak, Ronald M. (1994). Walker's Bats of the World. Johns Hopkins University Press. ISBN 978-0-8018-4986-2.
