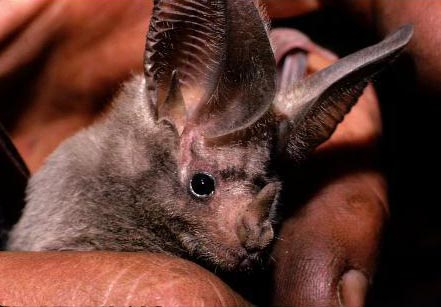
- California leaf-nosed bat (Macrotus californicus)

Scientific classification
- Kingdom: Animalia
- Phylum: Chordata
- Class: Mammalia
- Order: Chiroptera
- Family: Phyllostomidae
- Subfamily: Macrotinae
- Genus: Macrotus; Gray, 1843

Type species
- Macrotus waterhousii Gray, 1843

Species
- Macrotus californicus Macrotus waterhousii

= Macrotus =

Genus of bats

Macrotus is a genus of bats in the Neotropical family Phyllostomidae. It is the only member of the subfamily Macrotinae. This genus contains two species, Macrotus californicus commonly known as California leaf-nosed bat and Macrotus waterhousii commonly known as Mexican or Waterhouse's leaf-nosed bat. The range of this family includes the warmer parts of the southwestern United States, Mexico, Central and South America, and the Bahama Islands. Characteristic for the genus are large ears and the name giving triangular skin flap above the nose, the "leaf". The California Leaf-nosed Bat inhabits the arid deserts of the southwestern United States as far north as Nevada, south to Baja California and Sonora, Mexico. The California Leaf-nosed Bat is of medium size, with a total length between 9 and 11 cm Its most distinctive features are the large ears, connected across the forehead. The body is pale grayish brown dorsally with whitish under parts. The pelage (fur) on the body is silky, the hairs on the back about 8 mm, on the front about 6 mm long. The posterior base of the ears are covered with hair of a woolly texture while the interior surface and most of the anterior border shows scattered long hairs.

The flight membranes are thin and delicate; the wings are broad and the tail is slightly shorter that the long hind limbs and extends several millimeters beyond the uropatagium (see Bat). Macrotus waterhousii is also a big eared Bat which has ranges from Sonora to Hidalgo Mexico, south to Guatemala and the Greater Antilles (excluding Puerto Rico) and Bahamas. This species roosts primarily in caves, but also in mines and buildings. This species is also insectivorous (see insectivore), primarily consuming insects of the order Lepidoptera and Orthoptera. The mating and parturition times of M. waterhousii vary from island to island with 4–5 months gestation.

== Position within Phyllostomidae ==
- Phyllostomidae
  - Macrotinae
  - - Micronycterinae
    - - Desmodontinae
      - - Lonchorhininae
        - - Phyllostominae
          - - Glossophaginae
            - - Lonchophyllinae
              - - - Carolliinae
                  - Glyphonycterinae
                - - Rhinophyllinae
                  - Stenodermatinae

Internal divisions of Phyllostomidae

Macrotinae was proposed as a subfamily in 1992 by Van Den Bussche. Macrotinae is monogeneric within Phyllostomidae (containing only one genus). It is the most basal subfamily of the leaf-nosed bats, meaning that its lineage was the first to diverge from a common ancestor with all other subfamilies.

== Roosting ==
Macrotus has been mainly studied in the field in the Riverside Mountains of California. In the study area Macrotus roosts in the daytime exclusively in caves, deserted mine tunnels and deep grottos. They are usually within 30 to 80 feet of the entrance of the tunnel, and seemed not to require dark retreats. On many occasions leaf-nosed bats roost in tunnels less than 20 feet deep and fairly brightly lit. In order to be suitable the Macrotus retreat must be mostly enclosed and have overhead pro9tection from the weather. Roosting chambers are usually large enough to provide considerable ceiling surface and flying space, and thus adequate space allows the animal to find a place to roost while flying. The coolness of the roost also plays a factor in Macrotus selection of roosts, which is why Macrotus would choose to roost in a cool cave in the hot summers. Macrotus prefer to hang from sloping parts of the ceiling and actively grab the rock with ease due to the irregularity of the surface. the bat seems to rest much of the time while hanging onto the rock with only one foot. The free foot is often used for scratching and for grooming the fur, when the bat is engaged in these activities the body usually swings gently like an erratically disturbed pendulum.

== Foraging and flight ==
The flight of the Macrotus Is remarkable chiefly for its extreme maneuverability. The bat flies fairly rapidly on occasion, but the usual foraging flight is slow and buoyant, and more nearly silent that of most bats. In level flight Macrotus wings make a soft fluttering sound that is less sharp and carrying than the sounds made by the wing beats of most other bats. The method of landing is most interesting. The bat flies six to eight inches below the ceiling and upon the wings making a deep down stroke that is directed nearly straight forward the hind limbs and uropatagium. These movements cause the bat to swoop upward toward the ceiling and as the bat nears the ceiling the wings are pulled back in an upstroke while the bat rolls over 180 degrees so that its back is facing downward and the long legs reach for the ceiling. Stated briefly, then the alighting maneuver consists of an upward swoop and a half-roll, at the end of which the feet wing rapidly toward the ceiling, seize it, and the wings give a final beat to steady the bat. Often these landings must require remarkably precise judgement of speed and distance, as many landings are made in the midst of a fairly closely spaced group of bats.

Macrotus has two main methods of launching into flight, by dropping from the ceiling and taking flight after a short downward swoop, and by taking flight directly form the roosting place. The bat often hovers, both when foraging and when flying in its daytime retreat. Macrotus seems to hover easily, and it is able to hover for several seconds at a time. These bats usually forage within three feet of the ground and often drop down closer to the ground nearer the surface where they can occasionally hover for a few seconds. Even bats released in the daytime flew fairly close to the ground. Leaf-nosed bats seem to be totally insectivorous, and their food clearly reflects the bats' foraging habits. Some insects regularly eaten by Macrotus are almost certainly taken from the ground or from vegetation. The bats' stomachs often contain orthopteran insects, noctuid moths and caterpillars, and beetles of the families Scarabaeidae and Carabidae, along with unidentified material. The lists of food items of Macrotus contain a plethora of insects that seldom fly, are flightless, or that fly in the daytime; this constitutes strong evidence that this bat consumes insects that are on the ground or on vegetation. Most leaf-nosed bats forage sometime between one hour after sundown and four hours after sundown, and then retire to a night roosting place. Actually, each bat seems to have a pre-midnight foraging period of roughly one hour. The greatest activity in the early morning seems to occur between two and one half hours before sunrise and thirty minutes before sunrise. Bats generally begin returning with full stomachs to their daytime roosts about two hours before sunrise, and the last bats usually return approximately twenty minutes before sunrise.

== Osteology ==
In Macrotus the position of the hind limbs during level flight differs even more form that in most other mammals. The hind limbs are held behind the bat in a spider-leg- like posture, with the femur extending dorsad and caudad, and with the shank partially flexed and extending caudad and more or less downward.

The number of post cervical vertebrae in Macrotus are as follows: twelve thoracic, six lumbar, five sacral, seven caudal.
