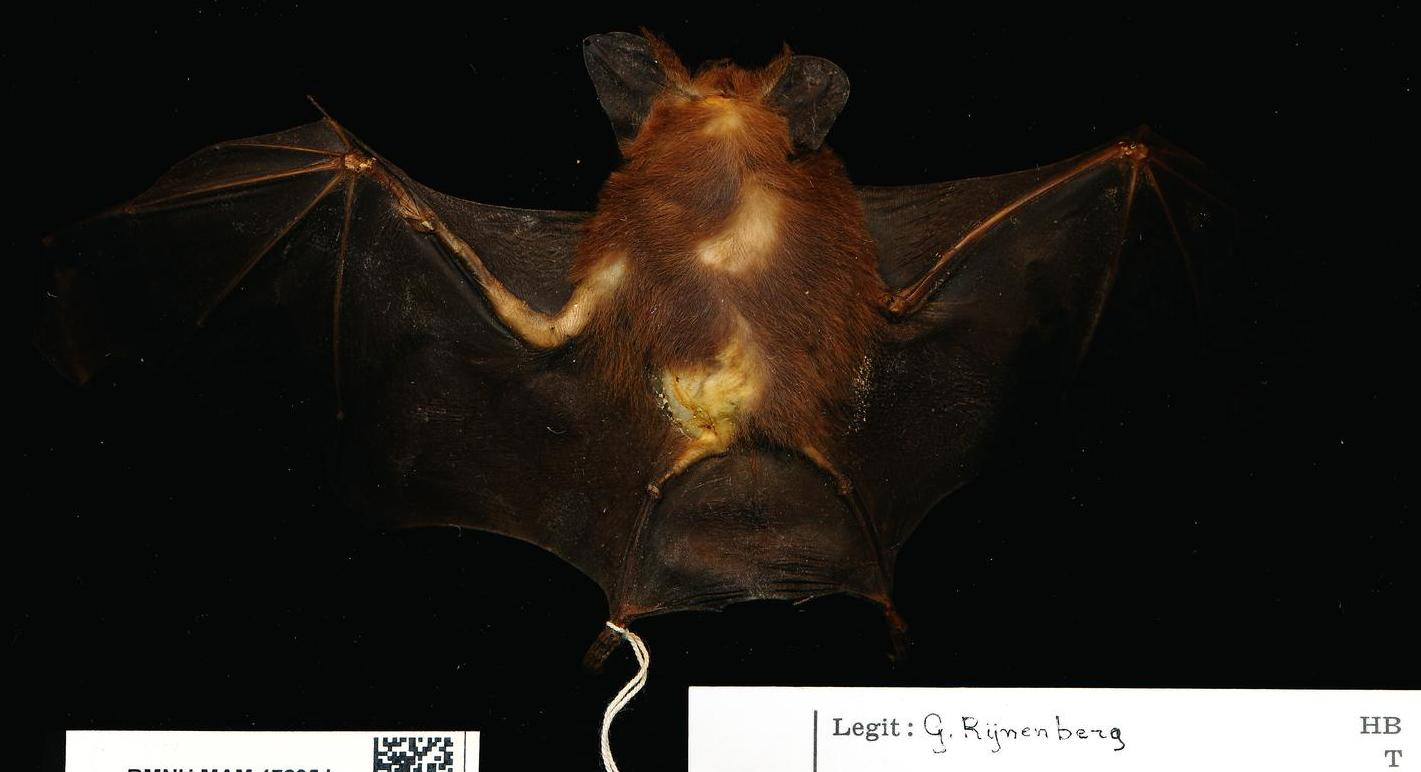
- Micronycteris megalotis megalotis

Scientific classification
- Kingdom: Animalia
- Phylum: Chordata
- Class: Mammalia
- Order: Chiroptera
- Family: Phyllostomidae
- Subfamily: Micronycterinae; Van Den Bussche, 1992

Type genus
- Micronycteris Gray, 1866

Genera
- Lampronycteris; Micronycteris

= Micronycterinae =

Subfamily of bats

Micronycterinae is a subfamily of leaf-nosed bats (Phyllostomidae). They are commonly known as the little big-eared bats. It contains two genera, Lampronycteris (one species) and Micronycteris (eleven species). Van Den Bussche (1992) was the first to propose the subfamily, which initially just contained Micronycteris. Previous studies had sometimes included these genera in the subfamily Phyllostominae.

== Position within Phyllostomidae ==
- Phyllostomidae
  - Macrotinae
  - - Micronycterinae
    - - Desmodontinae
      - - Lonchorhininae
        - - Phyllostominae
          - - Glossophaginae
            - - Lonchophyllinae
              - - - Carolliinae
                  - Glyphonycterinae
                - - Rhinophyllinae
                  - Stenodermatinae

Internal divisions of Phyllostomidae

It is one of the more basal subfamilies of the family Phyllostomidae. Of the eleven currently recognized subfamilies, only the Macrotinae lineage split before Micronycterinae.
