= Vieira's long-tongued bat =

Conservation status
- Data Deficient (IUCN 3.1)

Scientific classification
- Kingdom: Animalia
- Phylum: Chordata
- Class: Mammalia
- Order: Chiroptera
- Family: Phyllostomidae
- Genus: Xeronycteris; Gregorin & Ditchfield, 2005
- Species: X. vieirai

Binomial name
- Xeronycteris vieirai Gregorin & Ditchfield, 2005
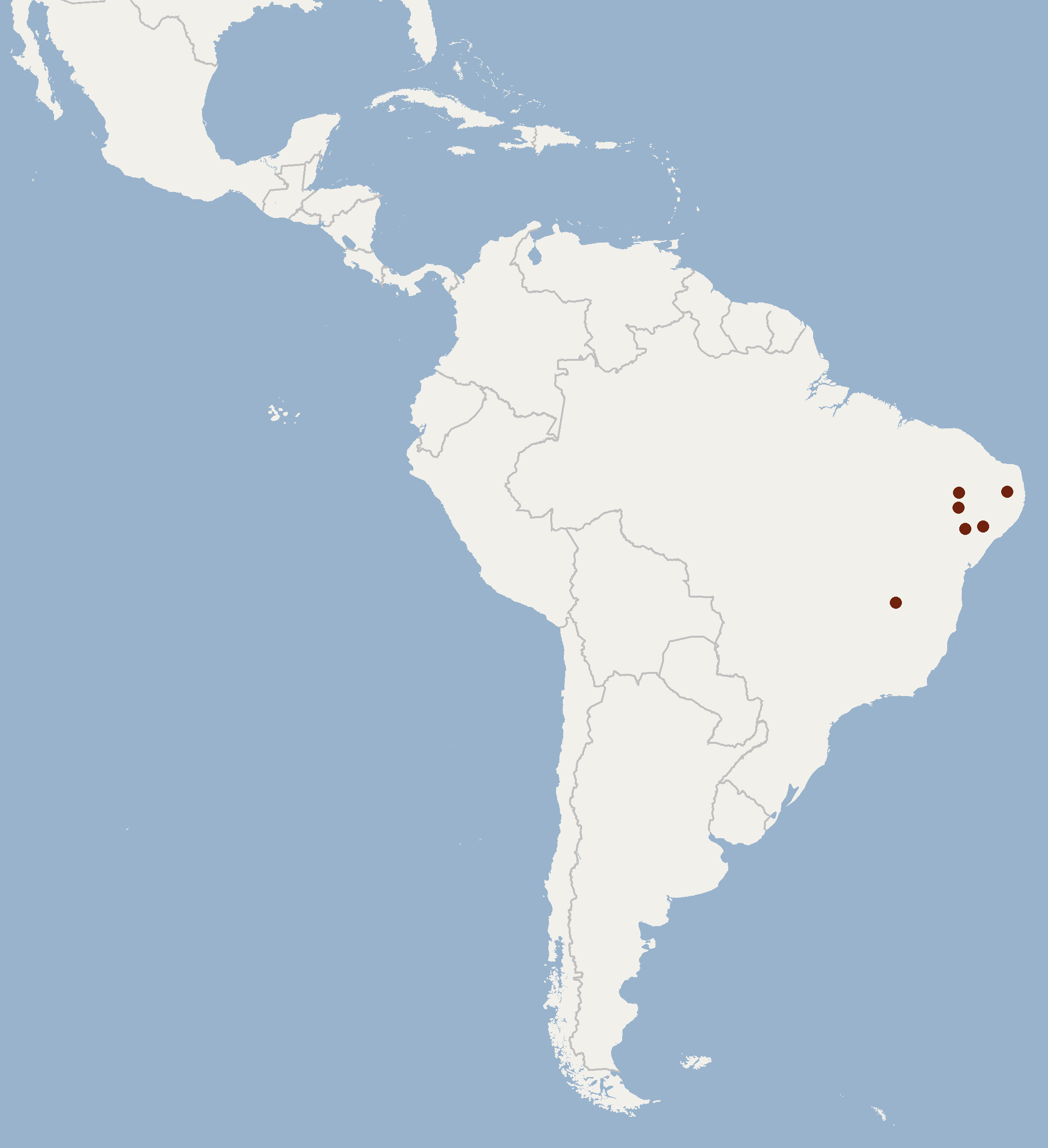
- Vieira's long-tongued bat range

Species of bat

Vieira's long-tongued bat (Xeronycteris vieirai) is a species of bat from northeastern Brazil, discovered in 2005 by Gregorin and Ditchfield. It is the only species in the genus Xeronycteris.
