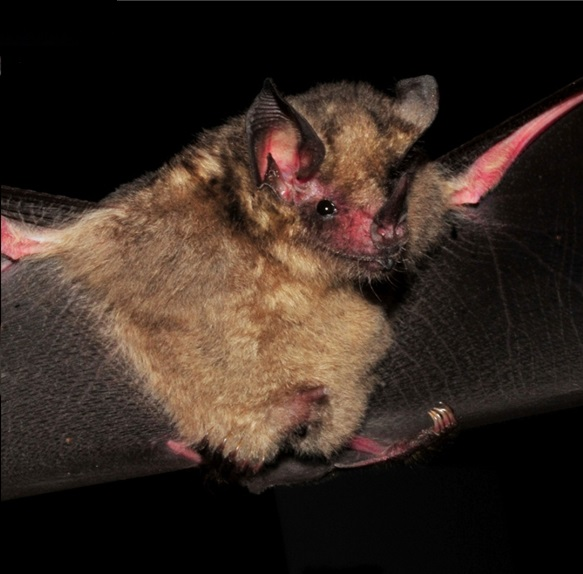
- Image of a Tricolored big-eared bat (Glyphonycteris sylvestris), a member of the Glyphonycteris genus

Scientific classification
- Domain: Eukaryota
- Kingdom: Animalia
- Phylum: Chordata
- Class: Mammalia
- Order: Chiroptera
- Family: Phyllostomidae
- Subfamily: Glyphonycterinae
- Genus: Glyphonycteris; Thomas, 1896

Type species
- Glyphonycteris sylvestris Thomas, 1896

= Glyphonycteris =

Genus of bats

Glyphonycteris is a genus of bat in the family Phyllostomidae. It contains the following species:

- Behn's bat (Glyphonycteris behnii)
- Davies's big-eared bat (Glyphonycteris daviesi)
- Tricolored big-eared bat (Glyphonycteris sylvestris)
