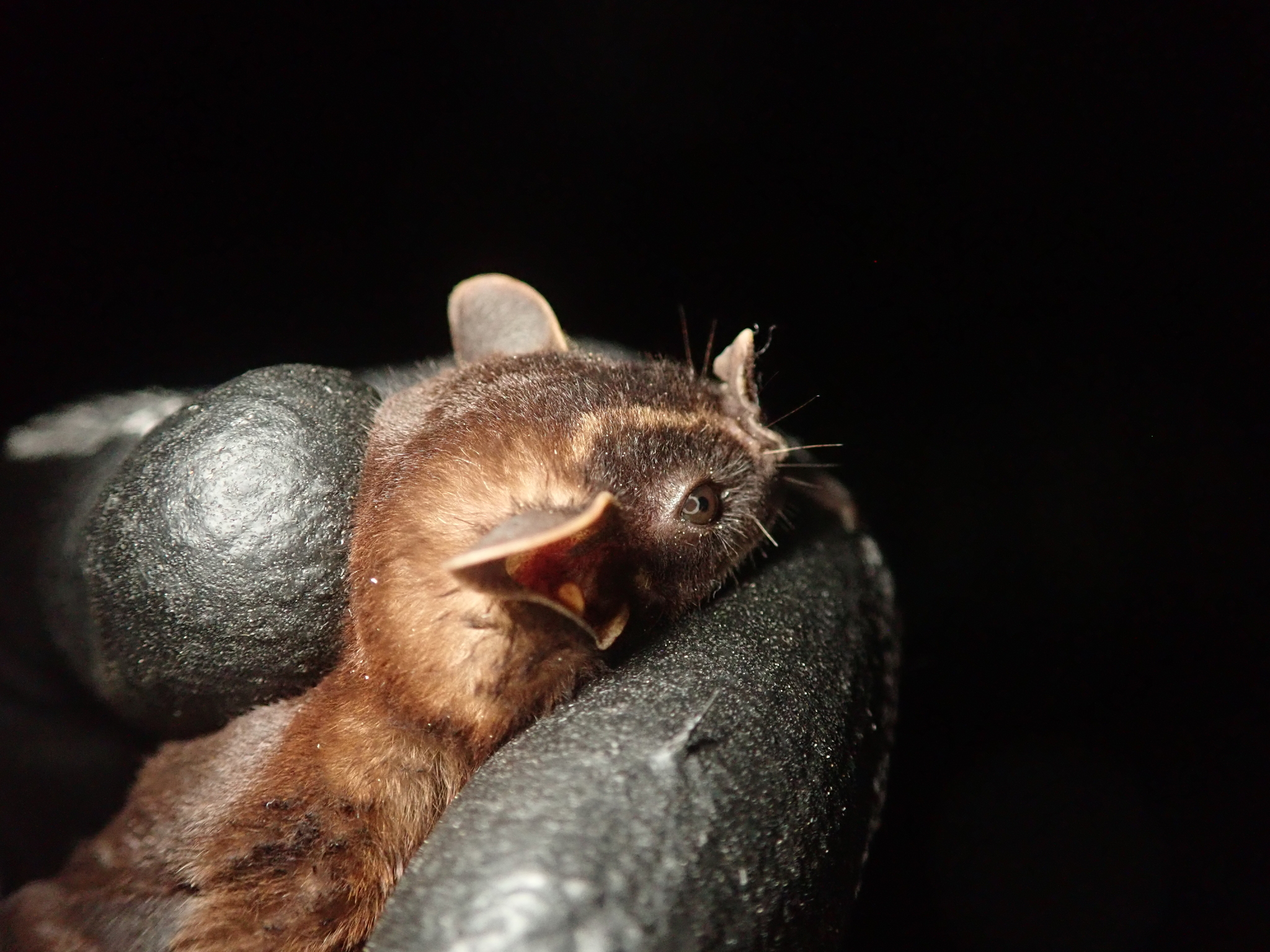
- In Puntarenas, Costa Rica

Conservation status
- Least Concern (IUCN 3.1)

Scientific classification
- Kingdom: Animalia
- Phylum: Chordata
- Class: Mammalia
- Order: Chiroptera
- Family: Phyllostomidae
- Genus: Enchisthenes; K. Andersen, 1906
- Species: E. hartii

Binomial name
- Enchisthenes hartii (Thomas, 1892)

Synonyms
- Artibeus hartii Thomas, 1892

= Velvety fruit-eating bat =

Species of Bats

The velvety fruit-eating bat (Enchisthenes hartii), also known as Hart's little fruit bat, is a species of bat in the family Phyllostomidae. It is the only species within the genus Enchisthenes. It is found in Central America, Mexico, the United States, and northern South America.

== Taxonomy and etymology ==
It was described as a new species in 1892 by British zoologist Oldfield Thomas. Thomas initially placed it in the genus Artibeus, with the scientific name Artibeus hartii. The eponym for the species name "hartii" is J. H. Hart, who provided the holotype to Thomas. Hart was the superintendent of the Botanic Gardens in Trinidad, which is the type locality.

The genus Enchisthenes was described in 1908 by Danish mammalogist Knud Andersen. He noted that Enchisthenes was closely related to Artibeus, and designated A. hartii as the type species and the only member of the genus. Though the opinion of the taxonomic validity of Enchisthenes has varied since its description, it has most recently been recognized as a valid monotypic genus.

== Description ==
Its fur is nearly black in color, and its face has a few faint lines that are paler in color. It has a forearm length of 36–41 mm (1.4–1.6 in). Individuals weigh 14–18 g (0.49–0.63 oz). Its dental formula is 2.1.2.32.1.2.3 for a total of 32 teeth.

== Range and habitat ==
Its range includes Bolivia, Colombia, Costa Rica, Ecuador, El Salvador, Guatemala, Honduras, Mexico, Panama, Peru, Trinidad and Tobago, and Venezuela. There is a single record from the United States state of Arizona.

== Conservation ==
As of 2008, it is evaluated as a least-concern species by the IUCN.
