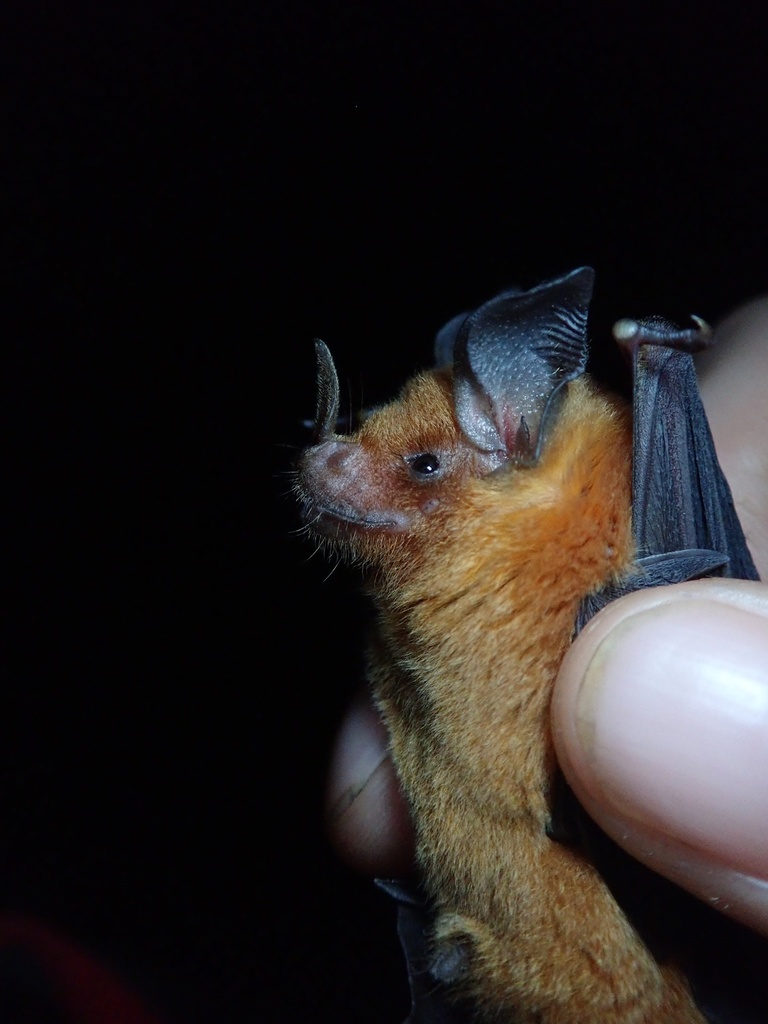
- Trinycteris nicefori

Scientific classification
- Kingdom: Animalia
- Phylum: Chordata
- Class: Mammalia
- Order: Chiroptera
- Family: Phyllostomidae
- Subfamily: Glyphonycterinae; Baker, Solari, Cirranello and Simmons, 2016

Type genus
- Glyphonycteris Thomas, 1896

Genera
- Glyphonycteris; Neonycteris; Trinycteris

= Glyphonycterinae =

Subfamily of bats

Glyphonycterinae is a subfamily of leaf-nosed bats. It contains the following genera:

- Glyphonycteris
- Neonycteris
- Trinycteris

Glyphonycterinae was proposed in 2016 by Baker, Solari, Cirranello and Simmons. Previous to this publication, Glyphonycteris and Trinycteris were both included in Phyllostominae. The authors followed Wetterer et al. 2000 in including Neonycteris within the subfamily, as it is a poorly known genus: only two individuals have ever been documented, and both more than seventy years ago. Wetterer et al. said that the combined evidence of morphology, karyotypes, and alloenzymes supported a clade of Glyphonycteris, Neonycteris, and Trinycteris. The members of Glyphonycterinae are insectivorous.
