= Charles O. Handley =

American zoologist and explorer

Charles Overton Handley, Jr. (July 14, 1924 – June 9, 2000) was a zoologist and explorer who conducted various expeditions for the United States government.

Born in Longview, Texas, Handley's father was a professor of wildlife management and an avid bird-watcher. In the summer after his high school graduation, Handley participated in an expedition to collect mammals in the Southern Appalachian mountains, with the Museum of Zoology of the University of Michigan. He thereafter resolved to study mammals. Handley received a B.A. from Virginia Tech in 1944, and served in World War II as a rifleman in the 120th Infantry, seeing action in Europe. After the war, the secretary of the Smithsonian Institution, Alexander Wetmore, hired Handley to collect birds and mammals on a naval icebreaker expedition to the Arctic. Handley received an M.A. from the University of Michigan in 1947, and a Ph.D. in mammalogy from that institution in 1955, in the interim participating in expeditions to the High Arctic, Labrador, Guatemala, and the Kalahari Desert.

Having described many new taxa lemmings and Arctic hares, Handley became a curator of mammals at the Smithsonian. He later conducted extensive surveys of the mammals of Panama and Venezuela, with a particular interest in bats, which he continued to study late in his life. He was described as "a leading authority on bats and other mammals". Handley died in Springfield, Virginia.
