= Behn's bat =

Conservation status
- Data Deficient (IUCN 3.1)

Scientific classification
- Kingdom: Animalia
- Phylum: Chordata
- Class: Mammalia
- Order: Chiroptera
- Family: Phyllostomidae
- Genus: Glyphonycteris
- Species: G. behnii

Binomial name
- Glyphonycteris behnii (Peters, 1865)

Synonyms
- Schizostoma behnii Peters, 1865; Micronycteris behnii (Peters, 1865)

Species of bat

Behn's bat, Behn's big-eared bat, or Behn's graybeard bat (Glyphonycteris behnii) is a species of bat in the family Phyllostomidae found in Brazil and Peru. It is known only from six specimens and is considered rare. It feeds on insects and small fruits.

== Taxonomy and etymology ==
Behn's bat was described in 1865 by German naturalist Wilhelm Peters. Peters placed it in the now-defunct genus Schizostoma with a scientific name of Schizostoma behnii. The holotype was collected in Cuiabá, Brazil. In 1898, Gerrit Smith Miller Jr. reclassified it, placing it in the genus Micronycteris. In 1906, Knud Andersen placed it in Glyphonycteris but spelled the species name as behni. The eponym for the species name "behnii" is German zoologist Wilhelm Friedrich Georg Behn.

== Description ==
Its forearm length is 44–50 mm (1.7–2.0 in). The lancet of its nose-leaf is about 1.5 times longer than it is wide.

== Biology and ecology ==
Based on the diets of closely related species, Behn's bat is likely omnivorous, consuming insects and small fruits.

== Range and habitat ==
Behn's bat is native to South America, where it is found in Brazil and Peru. In Brazil, it is found in the Cerrado.

== Conservation ==
As of 2016, it is evaluated as a data deficient species by the IUCN because only six individuals have ever been documented. Little is known about its population size, ecology, or potential threats. However, it is potentially threatened by habitat loss due to conversion to farmland.
