= Bernardo Villa Ramírez =

Mexican mammalogist (1911–2006)

Bernardo Villa Ramírez (May 4, 1911 – November 21, 2006) was a Mexican mammalogist. He published five books and over 100 articles: primarily on the biology of bats and rodents, but also on marine mammals.

Born in Teloloapan, Guerrero, Villa Ramírez studied in Guerrero and then Mexico City, returning to his hometown to build a school and become a rural school teacher. He later attended the National Autonomous University of Mexico (UNAM), receiving a master's degree in 1944, then received a second master's from the University of Kansas in 1947. He returned to UNAM as a researcher, professor, and doctoral student, completing his dissertation on the bats of Mexico in 1966. His resulting book, Los murcielagos de Mexico, became a standard reference for Mexican bat researchers. His memberships and service in scientific societies included an honorary life member of the American Society of Mammalogists, a president and honorary life member of the Mexican Association of Mammalogy, and first president of the Mexican Society for Marine Mammal Research.
