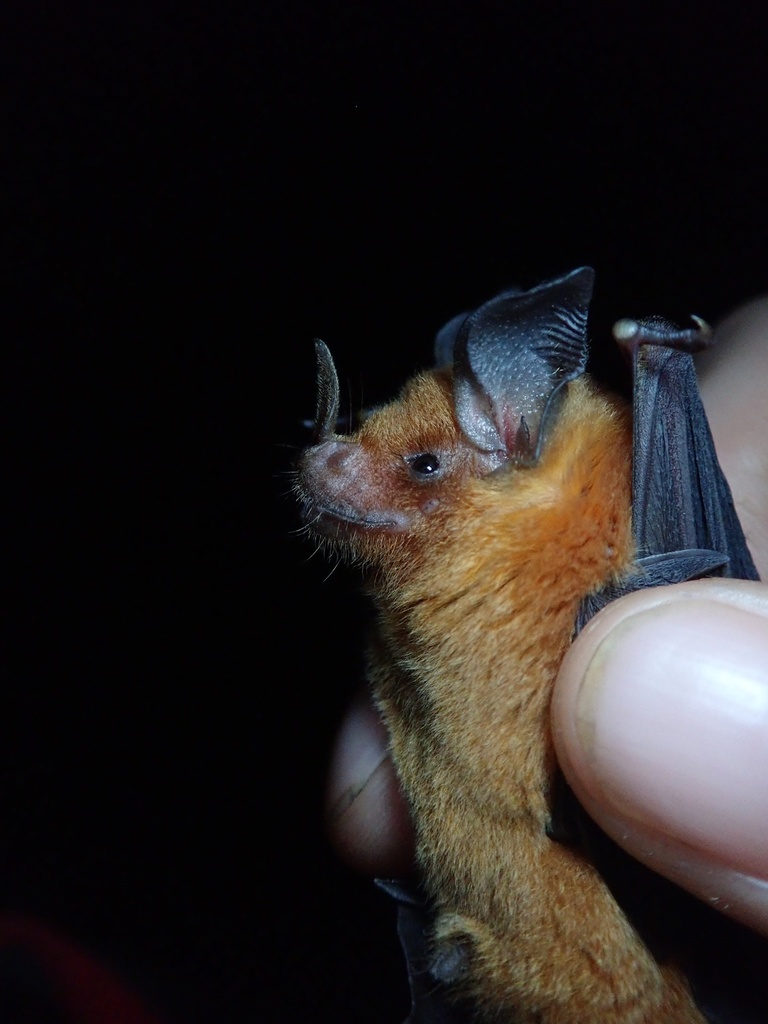

Conservation status
- Least Concern (IUCN 3.1)

Scientific classification
- Kingdom: Animalia
- Phylum: Chordata
- Class: Mammalia
- Order: Chiroptera
- Family: Phyllostomidae
- Genus: Trinycteris; Sanborn, 1949
- Species: T. nicefori

Binomial name
- Trinycteris nicefori Sanborn, 1949

= Niceforo's big-eared bat =

Species of bat

Niceforo's big-eared bat (Trinycteris nicefori) is a bat species from South and Central America, ranging from Chiapas to Bolivia and northeastern Brazil. Its habitat is primary and secondary forest at altitudes from sea level to 1000 m. It is crepuscular, being most active in the hour after sunset and before dawn. The species is monotypic within its genus.

== Description ==
It is a small species with triangular ears. Individuals weigh 7–11 g (0.25–0.39 oz) and have forearm lengths of 35–40 mm (1.4–1.6 in). Its fur is grayish-brown. Most individuals have a faint, pale-colored stripe that runs down their back along the spine. Its dental formula is 2.1.2.32.1.3.3 for a total of 34 teeth.

== Biology and ecology ==
It is nocturnal, roosting in sheltered places during the day such as hollow logs and human structures.

== Range and habitat ==
It is found in Belize, Bolivia, Brazil, Colombia Costa Rica, Ecuador, French Guiana, Guatemala, Guyana, Mexico, Nicaragua, Panama, Peru, Suriname, Trinidad and Tobago, and Venezuela. It is found at elevations up to 1,000 m (3,300 ft) above sea level.

== Conservation ==
As of 2015, it is classified as a least-concern species by the IUCN.
