= Least big-eared bat =

Conservation status
- Data Deficient (IUCN 3.1)

Scientific classification
- Kingdom: Animalia
- Phylum: Chordata
- Class: Mammalia
- Order: Chiroptera
- Family: Phyllostomidae
- Genus: Neonycteris; Sanborn, 1949
- Species: N. pusilla

Binomial name
- Neonycteris pusilla Sanborn, 1949

Species of bat

The least big-eared bat (Neonycteris pusilla) is a bat species of the family Phyllostomidae, found in northwestern Brazil and eastern Colombia. It is the only species within its genus.
