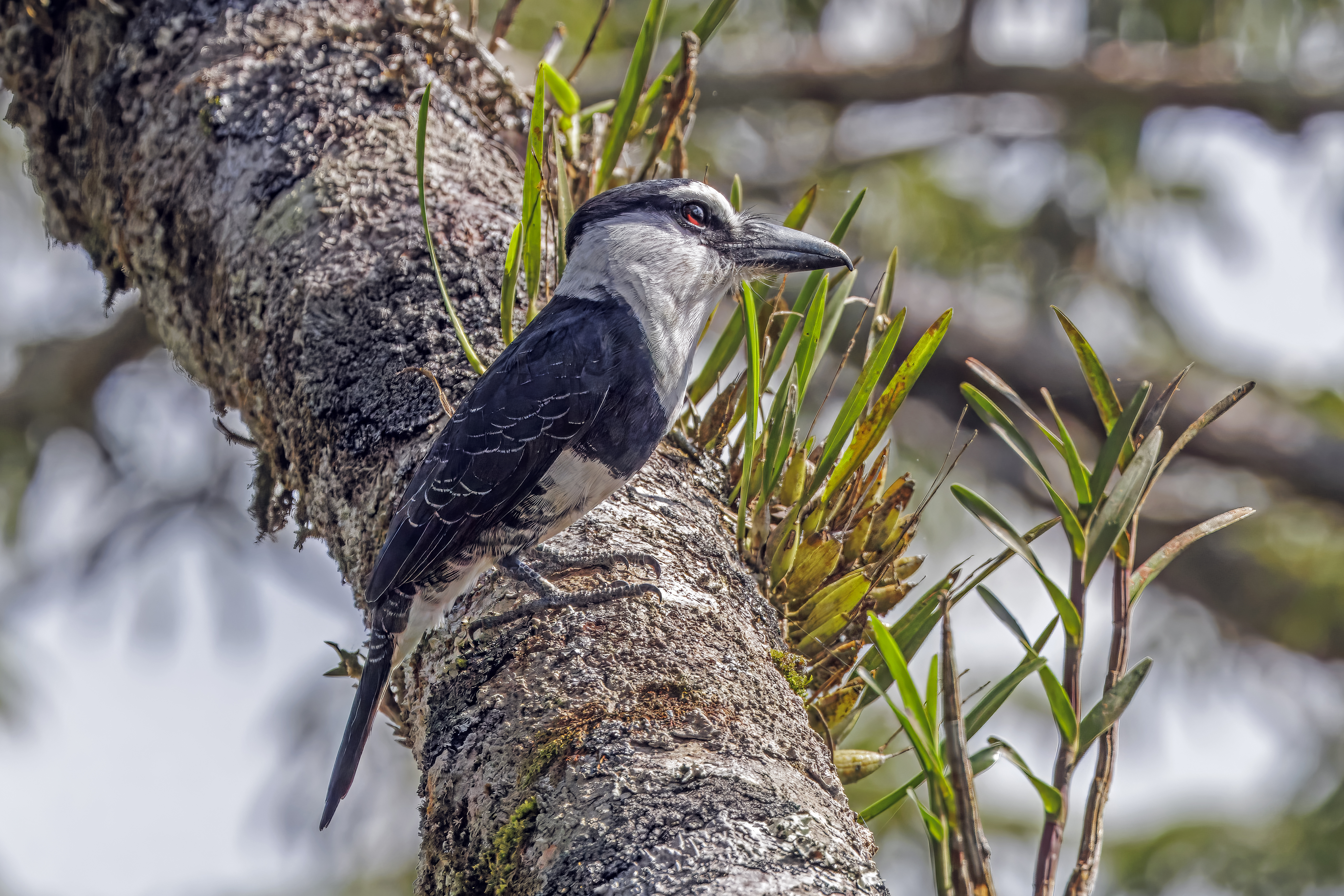
- Notharchus hyperrhynchus hyperrhynchus, Ecuador

Conservation status
- Least Concern (IUCN 3.1)

Scientific classification
- Kingdom: Animalia
- Phylum: Chordata
- Class: Aves
- Order: Piciformes
- Family: Bucconidae
- Genus: Notharchus
- Species: N. hyperrhynchus

Binomial name
- Notharchus hyperrhynchus (Sclater, PL, 1856)

Synonyms
- Notharchus macrorhynchos hyperrhynchus

= White-necked puffbird =

Species of bird

The white-necked puffbird (Notharchus hyperrhynchus) is a species of bird in the family Bucconidae, the puffbirds, nunlets, and nunbirds. It is found in Mexico, Central America, Bolivia, Brazil, Colombia, Ecuador, Peru, and Venezuela.

== Taxonomy and systematics ==
During the second half of the 20th century, the white-necked puffbird and what are now the buff-bellied puffbird (N. swainsoni) and Guianan puffbird (N. macrorhynchus) were treated as conspecific. As of 2021, the white-necked puffbird has two recognized subspecies, the nominate N. h. hyperrhynchus and N. h. paraensis. Those in El Salvador and northwestern Nicaragua have been proposed as a third subspecies, N. h. cryptoleucus, and those in northeastern Colombia's Sierra Nevada de Santa Marta might be, too.

== Description ==
The white-necked puffbird is about 25 cm (9.8 in) long and weighs 81 to 106 g (2.9 to 3.7 oz).It is mostly glossy black. It has a broad white forehead, throat, upper breast, and most of the belly. A broad black band separates the last two, and a black stripe runs from the beak to the crown, passing through a dark red eye. The white of the throat extends as a fairly broad line around the nape. The lower flanks are barred black and white and the tail is black with narrow white tips to the feathers. The very large bill and the feet are black. The two subspecies differ only in the length of the bill, with that of N. h. paraensis being exceptionally long.

== Distribution and habitat ==
The nominate subspecies of the white-necked puffbird is found from southern Mexico through Central America into northern Colombia and northwestern Venezuela, and separately in southwestern Colombia and western Ecuador. Another separate population is found in central Colombia, eastern Ecuador and Peru, northern Bolivia, and eastern Venezuela south and east into much of Amazonian Brazil. N. h. paraensis is found only in the Amazon River valley of the Brazilian state of Pará east of the Tapajós River. The species inhabits a wide variety of landscapes. It mostly occurs in semi-open environments such as secondary forest, the edges of primary forest, open woodlands, savanna, and clearings. It also occurs in the interior of tropical evergreen, semi-evergreen, and terra firme forest; the landward side of mangrove forest; and plantations. It is found at all levels of the forest, from the ground to the canopy. In elevation it mostly ranges from sea level to 1,200 m (3,900 ft).

== Behavior ==
=== Feeding ===
The white-necked puffbird hunts from an open perch by diving on its prey and will investigate army ant swarms. It beats its catch on the perch before eating it. Its diet is primarily insects and also includes small invertebrates and some fruits. There is one record of capture of a rufous-tailed hummingbird (Amazilia tzacatl).

=== Breeding ===
The white-necked puffbird's breeding season varies geographically but generally is within the March to September window. Both sexes excavate the nest cavity, usually in an arboreal termitarium or rotting tree. Most nests are about 12 to 15 m (39 to 49 ft) above the ground, but they have been reported as low as 3 m (9.8 ft) and as high as 18 m (59 ft). Holes in the ground and an earth bank have also been reported. The one documented clutch had two eggs.

=== Vocalization ===
Descriptions of the white-necked puffbird's song include "a long bubbling trill, at a constant pitch or rising slightly, then falling" and "an evenly pitched monotonous trill that lasts 3–5 seconds". It also makes "a descending whistle 'wheeew'" call and "a quiet growl."

== Status ==
The IUCN has assessed the white-necked puffbird as being of Least Concern. It has a very large range and a population of at least 500,000 mature individuals, though the latter is believed to be decreasing.
