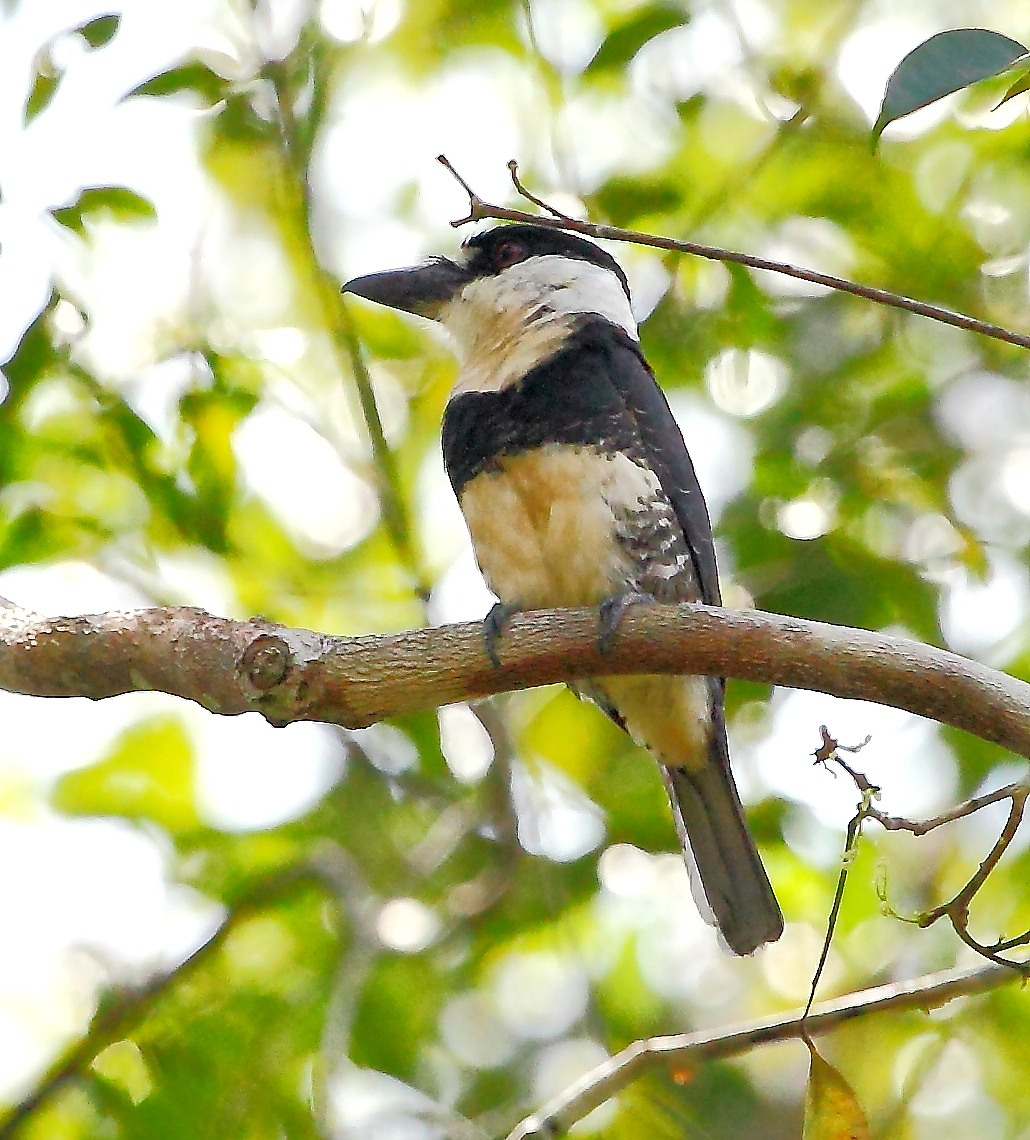
- Guianan puffbird at Manaus, Amazonas state, Brazil

Conservation status
- Least Concern (IUCN 3.1)

Scientific classification
- Kingdom: Animalia
- Phylum: Chordata
- Class: Aves
- Order: Piciformes
- Family: Bucconidae
- Genus: Notharchus
- Species: N. macrorhynchos

Binomial name
- Notharchus macrorhynchos (Gmelin, JF, 1788)

= Guianan puffbird =

Species of bird

The Guianan puffbird (Notharchus macrorhynchos) is a species of bird in the family Bucconidae, the puffbirds, nunlets, and nunbirds. It is found in Brazil, French Guiana, Guyana, Suriname, and Venezuela. It was formerly considered to be conspecific with the white-necked puffbird and the buff-bellied puffbird with the English name "white-necked puffbird".

== Taxonomy and systematics ==
The Guianan puffbird was formally described in 1788 by the German naturalist Johann Friedrich Gmelin in his revised and expanded edition of Carl Linnaeus's Systema Naturae. He placed it in the genus Bucco and coined the binomial name Bucco macrorhynchos. Gmelin based his description on the Tamatias noirs et blancs or Barbu à gros bec, de Cayenne that had been described and illustrated in 1780 by the French polymath the Comte de Buffon. Buffon's specimen had been sent to Paris from Cayenne by Monsieur Duval. The Guianan puffbird is now placed in the genus Notharchus that was introduced in 1863 by the German ornithologists Jean Cabanis and Ferdinand Heine. The generic name combines the Ancient Greek nōthēs meaning "sluggish" and arkhos meaning "leader" or "chief". The specific epithet macrorhynchos is from Ancient Greek makrorrhunkhos and means "long-billed".

The white-necked puffbird (Notharchus hyperrhynchus) and the buff-bellied puffbird (Notharchus swainsoni) were formerly considered as subspecies. In 2002 Pamela Rasmussen and Nigel Collar, in their chapter in the Handbook of the Birds of the World, promoted swainsoni to species status and suggested that hyperrhynchus might also be a separate species. In 2004 the South American Classification Committee of the American Ornithologists' Union split macrorhynchos into three species. The English name "white-necked puffbird" was transferred to Notharchus hyperrhynchus and a new name "Guianan puffbird" given to the nominate subspecies Notharchus macrorhynchos. These changes have been adopted by other taxonomists. The Guianan puffbird is now considered to be monotypic: no subspecies are recognised.

== Description ==
The Guianan puffbird is about 25 cm (9.8 in) long and weighs 81 to 106 g (2.9 to 3.7 oz). It is mostly glossy blue-black. It has a white forehead, throat, upper breast, and center of the belly. A broad black band separates the last two. The white of the throat extends as a narrow line around the nape. The flanks are barred black and white and the tail is black with narrow white tips to the feathers. The eye color varies from straw to red. The large bill and feet are black.

The song is "a series of whistles...'ui-ui-ui... wi-di-dik wi-di-dik wi-di-dik...'". It also makes "a clear nasal falling 'düür'" call.

== Distribution and habitat ==
The Guianan puffbird is found in extreme eastern Venezuela, the Guianas, and northeastern Brazil north of the Amazon River. It inhabits primary tropical evergreen forest, semi-evergreen forest, and terra firme forest. It occurs at all levels from the ground to the canopy.

== Behavior ==
=== Feeding ===
The Guianan puffbird hunts from an open perch by sallying, either catching its insect prey on the wing or plucking it from vegetation, and usually returning to the same perch. It beats its catch on the perch before eating it.

=== Breeding ===
Both sexes excavate the nest cavity, usually in an arboreal termitarium or rotting tree. Most nests are about 12 to 15 m (39 to 49 ft) above the ground, but they have been reported as low as 3 m (9.8 ft) and as high as 18 m (59 ft). Holes in the ground and an earth bank have also been reported. The clutch size is not known.

== Status ==
The IUCN has assessed the Guianan puffbird as being of Least Concern. It has a large range and a stable population of at least 50,000 mature individuals.
