= Bogota fruit-eating bat =

Conservation status
- Least Concern (IUCN 3.1)

Scientific classification
- Domain: Eukaryota
- Kingdom: Animalia
- Phylum: Chordata
- Class: Mammalia
- Order: Chiroptera
- Family: Phyllostomidae
- Genus: Dermanura
- Species: D. bogotensis

Binomial name
- Dermanura bogotensis Andersen, 1906

Synonyms
- Artibeus bogotensis K. Andersen, 1906; Artibeus cinereus bogotensis K. Andersen, 1906; Artibeus glaucus bogotensis Handley, 1987

Species of bat

The Bogota fruit-eating bat (Dermanura bogotensis) is a species of bat found in South America.

== Taxonomy and etymology ==
This bat was described in 1906 by Danish mammalogist Knud Andersen. He described it as a subspecies of the Gervais's fruit-eating bat, A. cinereus. The holotype had been collected near Bogotá, Colombia, undoubtedly inspiring the species name "bogotensis." Later, beginning in 1987, the taxon was considered a subspecies of the silver fruit-eating bat, D. glauca. In 2008, researchers proposed that the Bogota fruit-eating bat should be elevated to species rank.

== Description ==
It has pale brown fur and distinct white stripes on its face. The length of its head and body is 50–58 mm (2.0–2.3 in). It lacks a tail. Its hind feet are 14–16 mm (0.55–0.63 in) long; its ears are 17–18 mm (0.67–0.71 in); and its forearm is 37–42 mm (1.5–1.7 in) long. It weighs 9–15 g (0.32–0.53 oz).

== Biology and ecology ==
This bat is frugivorous. It is bimodally polyestrous, meaning that it has two breeding seasons in a year. These breeding seasons correspond to seasonal fruit abundance. Like many bat species, it is nocturnal, roosting in sheltered places during the day such as caves.

== Range and habitat ==
It has been documented in several countries in South America, including Colombia, Guyana, Peru, Suriname, and Venezuela. It has been recorded at elevations from 100–2,600 m (330–8,530 ft) above sea level. It is often found in montane forests.

== Conservation ==
It is currently evaluated as least concern by the IUCN. Major threats to this species, if any exist, have not been identified.
