= Escudo (disambiguation) =

The escudo is a unit of currency.

Escudo may also refer to:

- Escudo hummingbird, a hummingbird in the subfamily Trochilinae
- Puerto del Escudo, a mountain pass in Castile and León, Spain
- Suzuki Escudo, a 1989–present Japanese compact SUV series
  - Suzuki Grand Escudo, a 1998–2006 Japanese mid-size SUV
