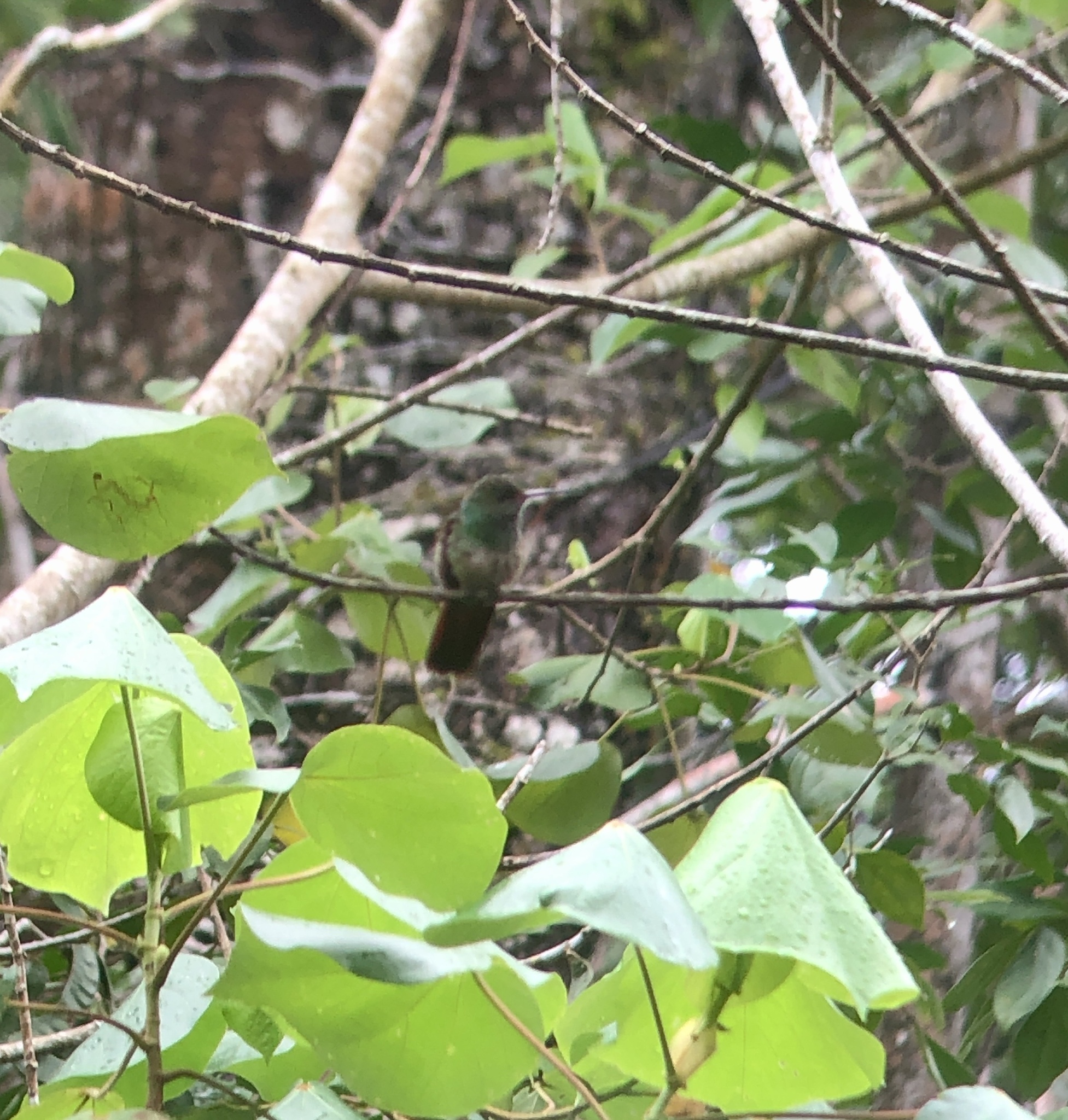

Scientific classification
- Kingdom: Animalia
- Phylum: Chordata
- Class: Aves
- Clade: Strisores
- Order: Apodiformes
- Family: Trochilidae
- Genus: Amazilia
- Species: A. tzacatl
- Subspecies: A. t. handleyi

Trinomial name
- Amazilia tzacatl handleyi Wetmore, 1963

Synonyms
- Amazilia handleyi Wetmore, 1963

= Escudo hummingbird =

Subspecies of bird

The Escudo hummingbird (Amazilia tzacatl handleyi) is a hummingbird in the subfamily Trochilinae. It has previously been distinct species, but more recently it is generally treated as a subspecies of the rufous-tailed hummingbird, A. tzacatl.

It is endemic to Isla Escudo de Veraguas in Panama. Except for its larger size, it is similar to the rufous-tailed hummingbird. Its natural habitat is tropical moist shrubland and woodland. With a total range estimated at only 3 km^{2}, it is potentially threatened by habitat loss or invasive species.

== Taxonomy and systematics ==
The Escudo hummingbird was described as a separate species in 1963, but its status has often been debated. Currently, it is considered a subspecies of the larger A. tzacatl group. Like many endemic taxa of Isla Escudo de Veraguas, it likely diverged from the mainland taxa somewhere around 9,000 years ago when post-glacial sea-level rise separated the island.

== Description ==
The Escudo hummingbird, like other subspecies within A. tzacatl, is a medium-sized hummingbird with green plumage, a pink beak, and a distinctive rufous tail. Unlike mainland subspecies, however, the Escudo birds are notably larger and darker in overall color.

== Conservation ==
When it was still considered as a distinct species, it was classified as Vulnerable species by the IUCN, noting that any evidence of a declining population could lead to an uplisting to Critically Endangered status. In 2008, it was removed from the IUCN Red List, however, as only taxa considered as full species can be listed.
