= Oedipina maritima =

Conservation status
- Critically Endangered (IUCN 3.1)

Scientific classification
- Kingdom: Animalia
- Phylum: Chordata
- Class: Amphibia
- Order: Urodela
- Family: Plethodontidae
- Genus: Oedipina
- Species: O. maritima

Binomial name
- Oedipina maritima García-París and Wake, 2000

Species of amphibian

Oedipina maritima, commonly known as the maritime worm salamander, is a species of salamander in the family Plethodontidae. It is endemic to Isla Escudo de Veraguas, Panama.

== Description ==
Oedipina maritima is a small salamander species: males grow to a snout–vent length (SVL) of 40–46 mm (1.6–1.8 in) and females to 35–44 mm (1.4–1.7 in). The head is small and narrow, and the body is slender, with tail longer than SVL.

The clutch size is about six eggs. They have direct development: eggs hatch into juveniles that measure about 12 mm (0.47 in) in total length, still retaining their gills.

== Range and habitat ==
This species is known only from Isla Escudo de Veraguas in Bocas del Toro Province, Panama. If it is restricted to this island (there is a juvenile specimen from the mainland that may belong to this species), it is the only tropical salamander that is endemic to an island. It is found close to sea level in humid lowland forest and mangrove forest. The type series was found in decaying fronds and associated moist litter near a fallen palm in a coconut palm grove.

It is threatened by habitat loss (forest clearance).
