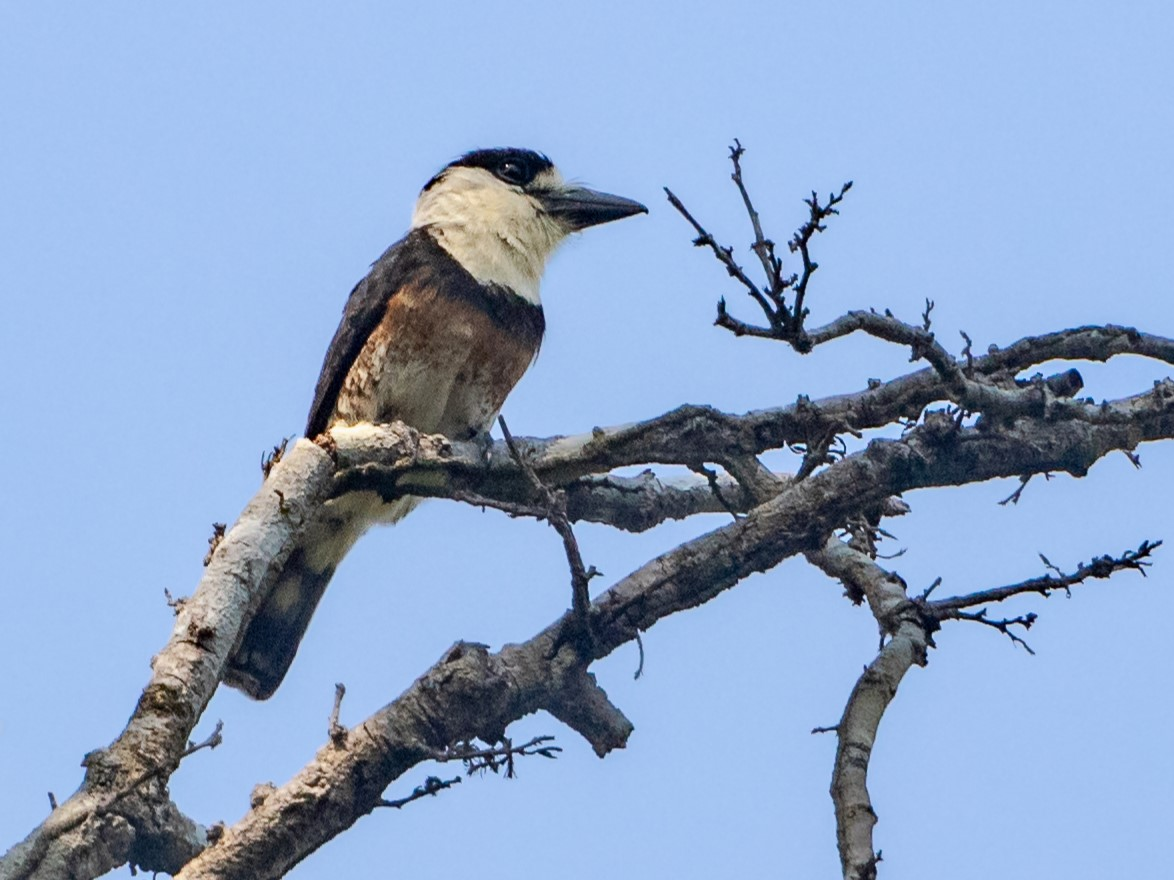
- Brown-banded puffbird at Porto Velho, Rondônia state, Brazil

Conservation status
- Least Concern (IUCN 3.1)

Scientific classification
- Kingdom: Animalia
- Phylum: Chordata
- Class: Aves
- Order: Piciformes
- Family: Bucconidae
- Genus: Notharchus
- Species: N. ordii

Binomial name
- Notharchus ordii (Cassin, 1851)

= Brown-banded puffbird =

Species of bird

The brown-banded puffbird (Notharchus ordii) is a species of bird in the family Bucconidae, the puffbirds, nunlets, and nunbirds. It is found in Bolivia, Brazil, Colombia, Peru, and Venezuela.

== Taxonomy and systematics ==
The brown-banded puffbird is monotypic. It is closely related to the black-breasted puffbird (N. pectoralis) and some authors have proposed that they form a superspecies.

== Description ==
The brown-banded puffbird is about 20 cm (7.9 in) long and weighs about 51.5 g (1.8 oz). It crown, nape, upperparts, and a thin line from the gape to the eye are a slightly glossy black. The lower part of its forehead; its face, chin, throat and upper breast; and a thin white line at the base of the nape are white. A black band separates the white upper breast from the olive-brown lower breast. The central belly is white with brown spots and the flanks white with black spots. The upper side of the tail is black with white tips to the feathers and the underside has a white band at the middle. A white band on the underwing shows in flight. The large bill and the feet are black and the eye dark brown.

== Distribution and habitat ==
The brown-banded puffbird has a highly disjunct distribution. One large region spans from southern Venezuela's Amazonas state into northwestern Brazil's Amazonas state. Another region is in Brazil's Rondônia state and a third at the intersection of Brazil, Peru, and Bolivia. There are also scattered records elsewhere in Bolivia, Brazil, Colombia, and Peru. It inhabits the interior and edges of rainforest and transitional forest, stunted forest on white-sand and other nutrient-poor soils, and the edges of terra firme forest. It tends to remain in the canopy.

== Behavior ==
=== Feeding ===
Little is known about the brown-banded puffbird's feeding behavior and diet. The few observations suggest that it hunts like others of its genus, sallying from a perch to catch insects or pluck them from vegetation.

=== Breeding ===
The one described nest of the brown-banded puffbird was a cavity in an arboreal termitarium about 4.5 m (15 ft) up in a mostly bare tree; both sexes excavated it.

=== Vocalization ===
The brown-banded puffbird's song is "lengthy, with several clear, loud introductory whistles followed by cadenced couplets and triplets."

== Status ==
The IUCN has assessed the brown-banded puffbird as being of Least Concern. Though its population has not been quantified, it is believed to be stable. Though it is widely distributed, it appears to occur at low density.
