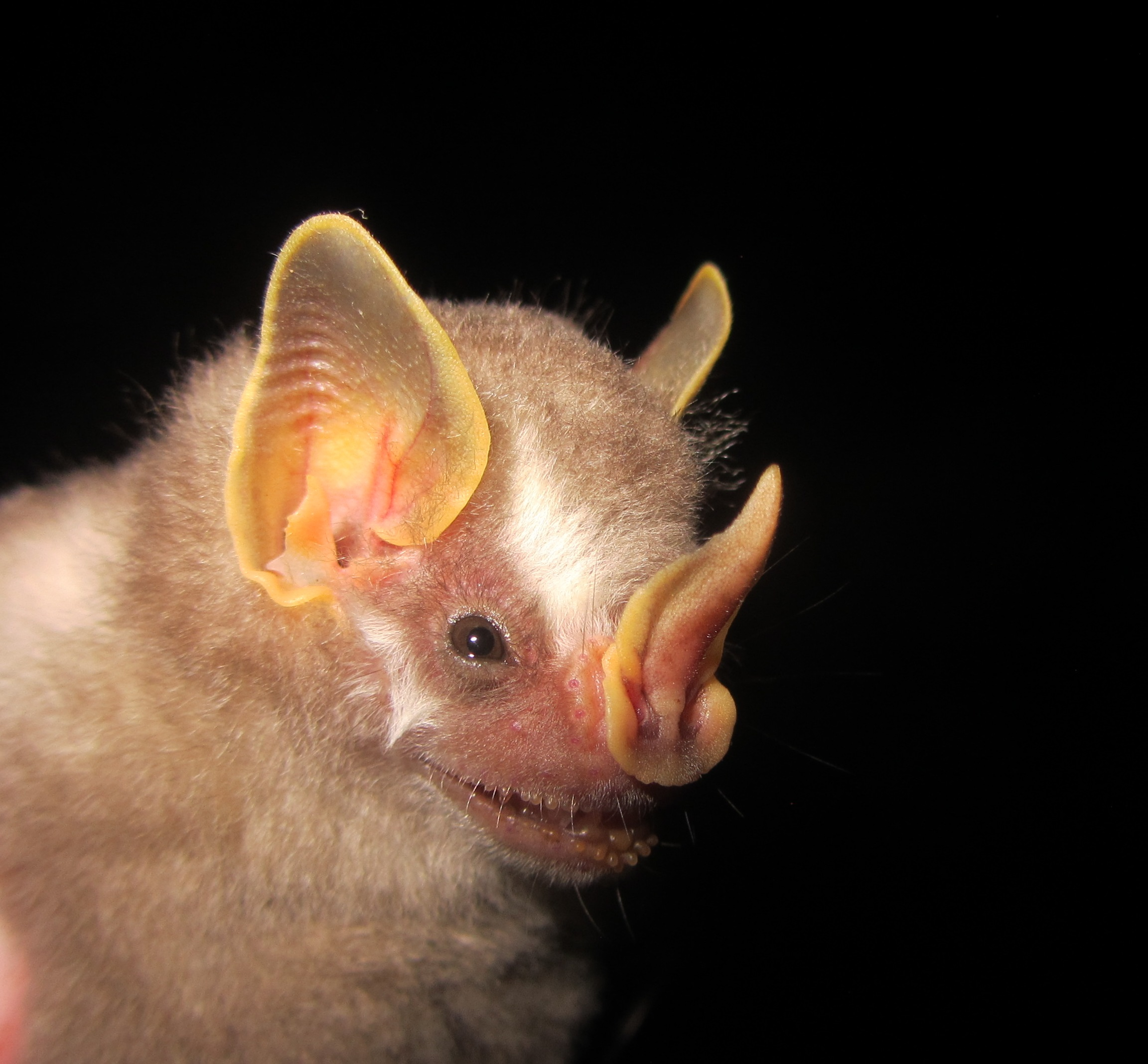
- Dermanura sp.

Scientific classification
- Domain: Eukaryota
- Kingdom: Animalia
- Phylum: Chordata
- Class: Mammalia
- Order: Chiroptera
- Family: Phyllostomidae
- Genus: Dermanura; Gervais, 1856

Species
- Dermanura anderseni Dermanura azteca Dermanura bogotensis Dermanura cinerea Dermanura glauca Dermanura gnoma Dermanura phaeotis Dermanura rava Dermanura rosenbergi Dermanura tolteca Dermanura watsoni

= Dermanura =

Genus of bats

Dermanura is a genus of leaf-nosed bats.

Genus Dermanura

- Andersen's fruit-eating bat, Dermanura anderseni
- Aztec fruit-eating bat, Dermanura azteca
- Bogota fruit-eating bat, Dermanura bogotensis
- Gervais's fruit-eating bat, Dermanura cinerea
- Silver fruit-eating bat, Dermanura glauca
- Gnome fruit-eating bat, Dermanura gnoma
- Pygmy fruit-eating bat, Dermanura phaeotis
- Dermanura rava
- Rosenberg's fruit-eating bat, Dermanura rosenbergi
- Toltec fruit-eating bat, Dermanura tolteca
- Thomas's fruit-eating bat, Dermanura watsoni
