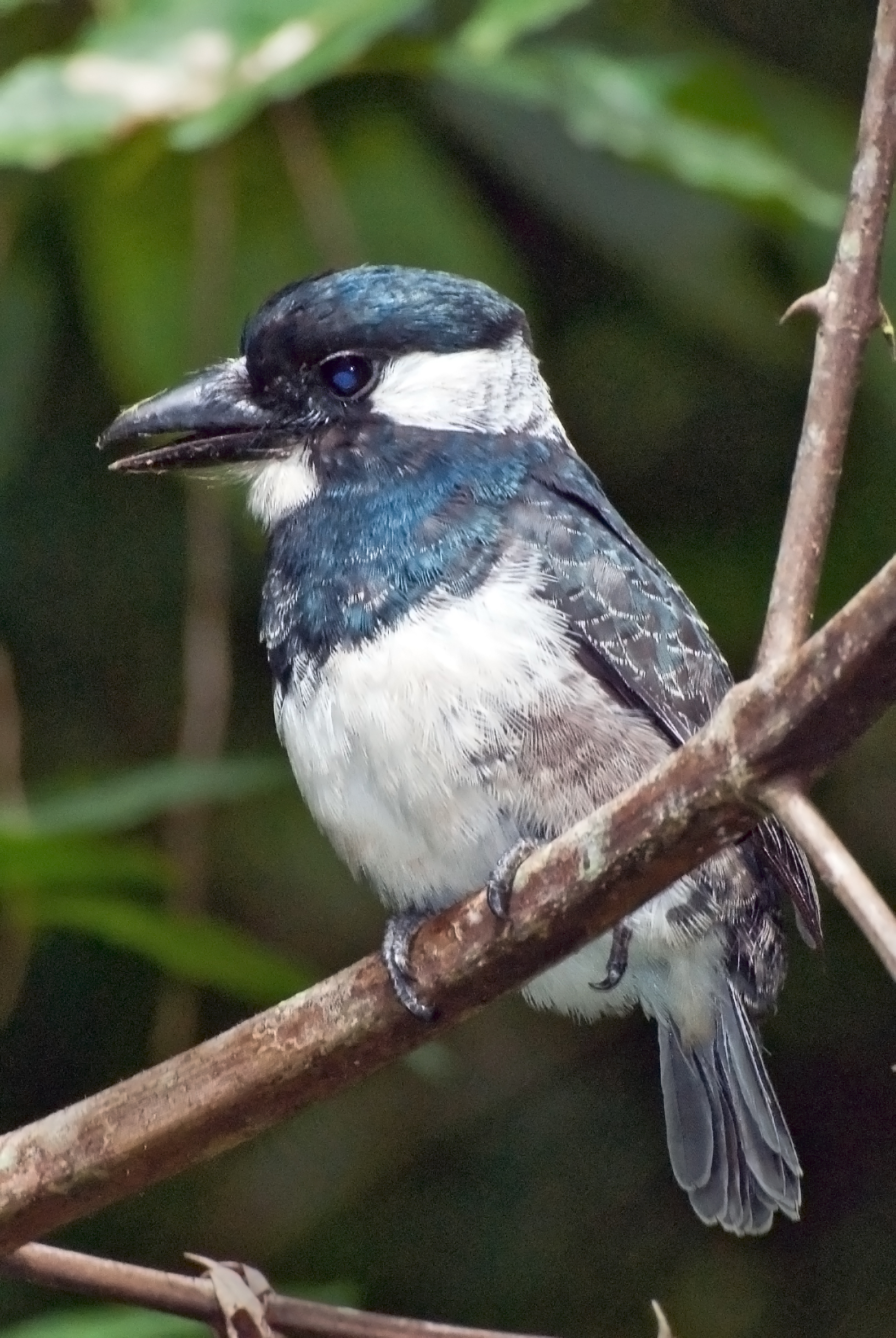
- Black-breasted puffbird (Notharchus pectoralis)

Scientific classification
- Kingdom: Animalia
- Phylum: Chordata
- Class: Aves
- Order: Piciformes
- Family: Bucconidae
- Genus: Notharchus; Cabanis & Heine, 1863

Type species
- Bucco hyperrhynchus P.L. Sclater, 1856

Species
- See text

= Notharchus =

Genus of birds

Notharchus is a genus of puffbird in the Bucconidae family.

The genus was introduced by the German ornithologists Jean Cabanis and Ferdinand Heine in 1863. The type species was subsequently designated as the white-necked puffbird (Notharchus hyperrhynchus) by the English zoologist Philip Sclater in 1882. The generic name combines the Ancient Greek nōthēs meaning "sluggish" and arkhos meaning "leader" or "chief".

The genus contains six species:

Genus Notharchus – Cabanis & Heine, 1863 – six species
Common name	Scientific name and subspecies	Range	Size and ecology	IUCN status and estimated population
White-necked puffbird	Notharchus hyperrhynchus (Sclater, PL, 1856)	northern Colombia (including Magdalena Valley), northern Venezuela, and the western and southern Amazon Basin	Size: Habitat: Diet:	LC
Guianan puffbird	Notharchus macrorhynchos (Gmelin, JF, 1788)	north-eastern South America (and named after The Guianas), in far eastern Venezuela, north-eastern Brazil, Guyana, Suriname and French Guiana	Size: Habitat: Diet:	LC
Brown-banded puffbird	Notharchus ordii (Cassin, 1851)	Bolivia, Brazil, and Peru, and in the Orinoco River region of Venezuela	Size: Habitat: Diet:	LC
Black-breasted puffbird	Notharchus pectoralis (Gray, 1846)	Colombia, Ecuador, and Panama.	Size: Habitat: Diet:	LC
Buff-bellied puffbird	Notharchus swainsoni (Gray, 1846)	Argentina, Brazil, and Paraguay	Size: Habitat: Diet:	LC
Pied puffbird	Notharchus tectus (Boddaert, 1783) Three subspecies: N. t. subtectus (Sclater, PL, 1860); N. t. picatus (Sclater, PL, 1856); N. t. tectus (Boddaert, 1783)	Bolivia, Brazil, Colombia, Costa Rica, Ecuador, French Guiana, Guyana, Panama, Peru, Suriname, and Venezuela.	Size: Habitat: Diet:	LC
