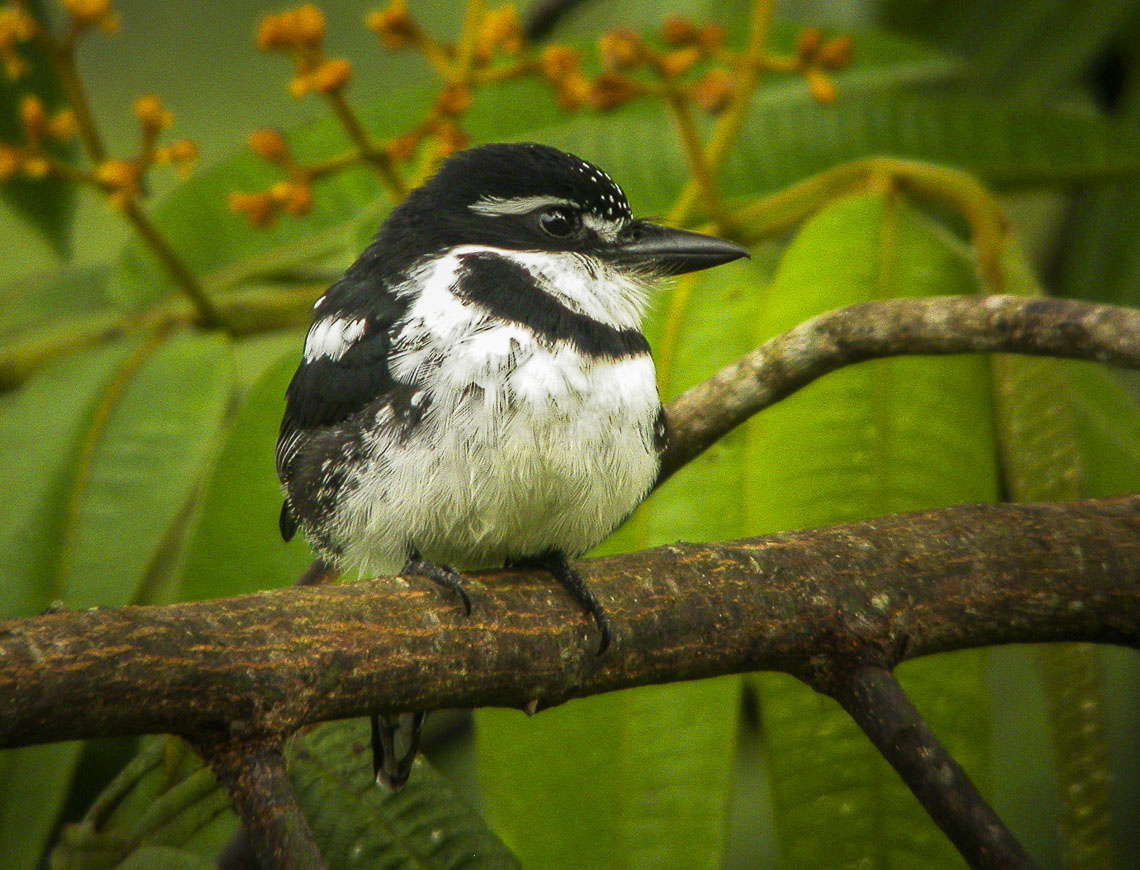
- In Mindo, Ecuador

Conservation status
- Least Concern (IUCN 3.1)

Scientific classification
- Kingdom: Animalia
- Phylum: Chordata
- Class: Aves
- Order: Piciformes
- Family: Bucconidae
- Genus: Notharchus
- Species: N. tectus

Binomial name
- Notharchus tectus (Boddaert, 1783)

Synonyms
- Bucco tectus

= Pied puffbird =

Species of bird

The pied puffbird (Notharchus tectus) is a species of bird in the family Bucconidae, the puffbirds, nunlets, and nunbirds. It is found in Bolivia, Brazil, Colombia, Costa Rica, Ecuador, French Guiana, Guyana, Nicaragua, Panama, Peru, Suriname, and Venezuela.

== Taxonomy and systematics ==
The pied puffbird was described by the French polymath Georges-Louis Leclerc, Comte de Buffon in 1780 in his Histoire Naturelle des Oiseaux from a specimen collected in Cayenne, French Guiana. The bird was also illustrated in a hand-colored plate engraved by François-Nicolas Martinet in the Planches Enluminées D'Histoire Naturelle that was produced under the supervision of Edme-Louis Daubenton to accompany Buffon's text. Neither the plate caption nor Buffon's description included a scientific name but in 1783 the Dutch naturalist Pieter Boddaert coined the binomial name Bucco tectus in his catalogue of the Planches Enluminées. The pied puffbird is now placed in the genus Notharchus that was introduced by the German ornithologists Jean Cabanis and Ferdinand Heine in 1863. The generic name combines the Ancient Greek nōthēs meaning "sluggish" and arkhos meaning "leader" or "chief". The specific epithet tectus is Latin for "covered" or "concealed".

The International Ornithological Committee (IOC) and the Clements taxonomy recognize these three subspecies. However, BirdLife International's Handbook of the Birds of the World (HBW) treats subtectus as a separate species, "lesser pied puffbird".

- N. t. subtectus (Sclater, PL, 1860)
- N. t. picatus (Sclater, PL, 1856)
- N. t. tectus (Boddaert, 1783)

The genus Notharchus was for a time merged into Bucco by some authorities but has generally been restored to its former status.

== Description ==
The pied puffbird is 14 to 17 cm (5.5 to 6.7 in) long and weighs 21 to 40 g (0.74 to 1.41 oz). The nominate subspecies is mostly glossy black above and white below. It has a white line from the bill through the eye, white speckles on the crown, a large white spot on the scapulars, and white near the base of the tail and at its end. A broad black band separates the breast from the belly and the flanks are barred black and white. N. t. picatus is larger and darker than the nominate, with less white on the tail feathers. N. t. subtectus is smaller than the nominate, with a narrower breast band, less white spotting on the crown, and grayer flanks with little white barring.

== Distribution and habitat ==
The nominate subspecies of pied puffbird is found in southern Venezuela, the Guianas, and northern Amazonian Brazil as far east as the state of Maranhão. N. t. picatus is found from southeastern Colombia south through eastern Ecuador and Peru into eastern Bolivia and east into west-central Brazil. N. t. subtectus is found from extreme southeastern Nicaragua through Costa Rica and Panama into north central Colombia, and through western Colombia into northwestern Ecuador. The species is generally resident throughout its range, but appears to make some irregular seasonal movements.

The pied puffbird inhabits a variety of landscapes from savanna to the interior and edges of tropical evergreen forest. other examples include secondary forest, gallery forest, abandoned clearings, and mangroves. It tends to prefer the canopy and subcanopy. In Costa Rica it appears to shun primary forest, occurring in more open landscapes up to an elevation of 300 m (980 ft). Elsewhere it occurs as high as 1,000 m (3,300 ft).

== Behavior ==
=== Feeding ===
The pied puffbird hunts for its arthropod prey by sallies from an exposed perch, usually high in the canopy. Known dietary items include spiders and insects of many families in at least seven orders.

=== Breeding ===
The pied puffbird's breeding season varies within its large range, with breeding activity in some area in almost any month. The nest is typically a cavity excavated in an arboreal termitarium anywhere between 4 and 25 m (13 and 82 ft) above the ground. The clutch size is two eggs; whether both parents incubate them is not known but both feed the young.

=== Vocalization ===
The pied puffbird's song differs somewhat between the subspecies. Those of the nominate and N. t. picatus is described as a "thin but loud, high-pitched, bat-like series of whistles, 'tee-oo' or 'pweee pweee pweee' in various patterns". That of N. t. subtectus is "apparently higher-pitched and possibly more piping, [and] less modulated".

== Status ==
The IUCN follows HBW taxonomy, and so treats the pied puffbird as two species. Both "greater" (N. t. tectus/tecatus) and "lesser" (N. t. subtectus) are assessed as being of Least Concern. Neither has a quantified population, and both are believed to be declining. The pied puffbird occurs in at least one protected area in most countries, but deforestation has affected the populations in Costa Rica and Ecuador.

== Gallery ==
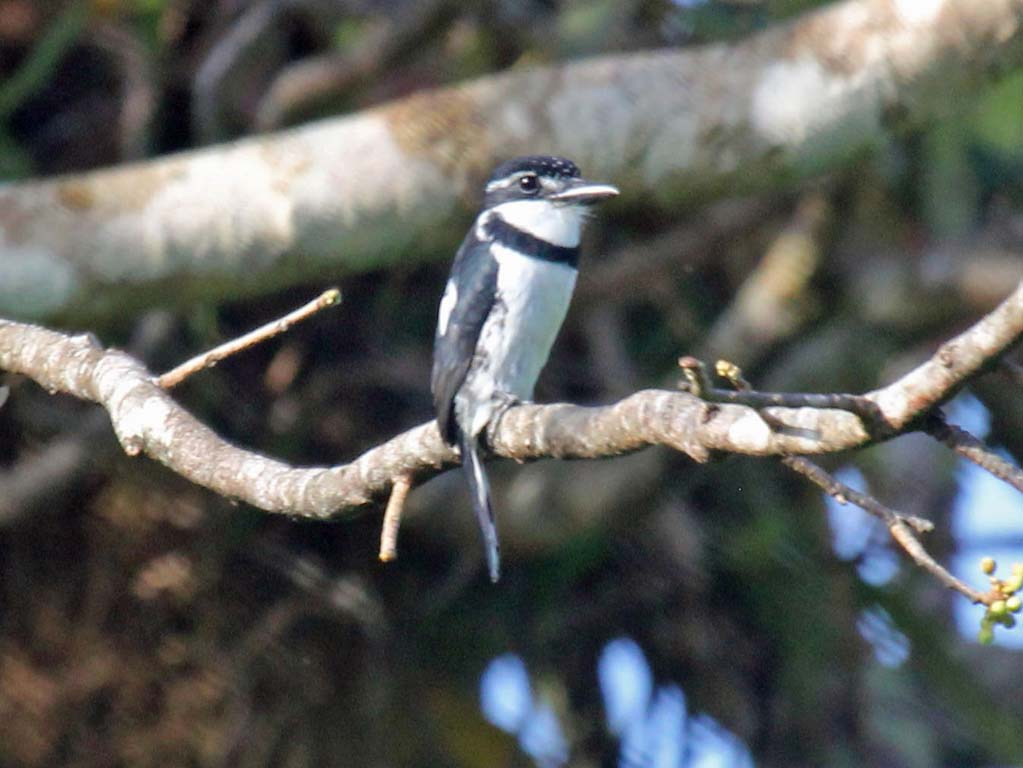
In Panama

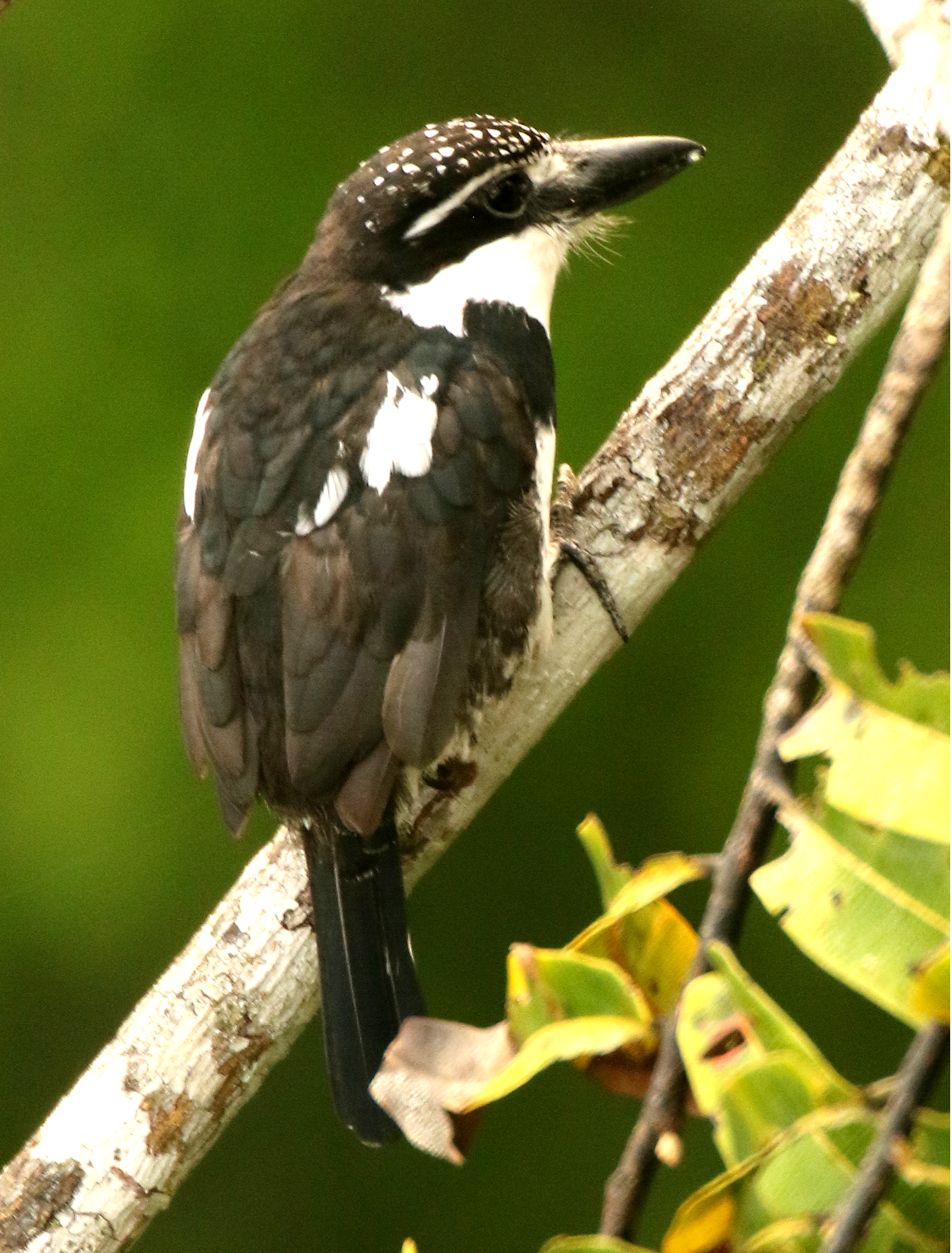
Sacha Lodge, Ecuador

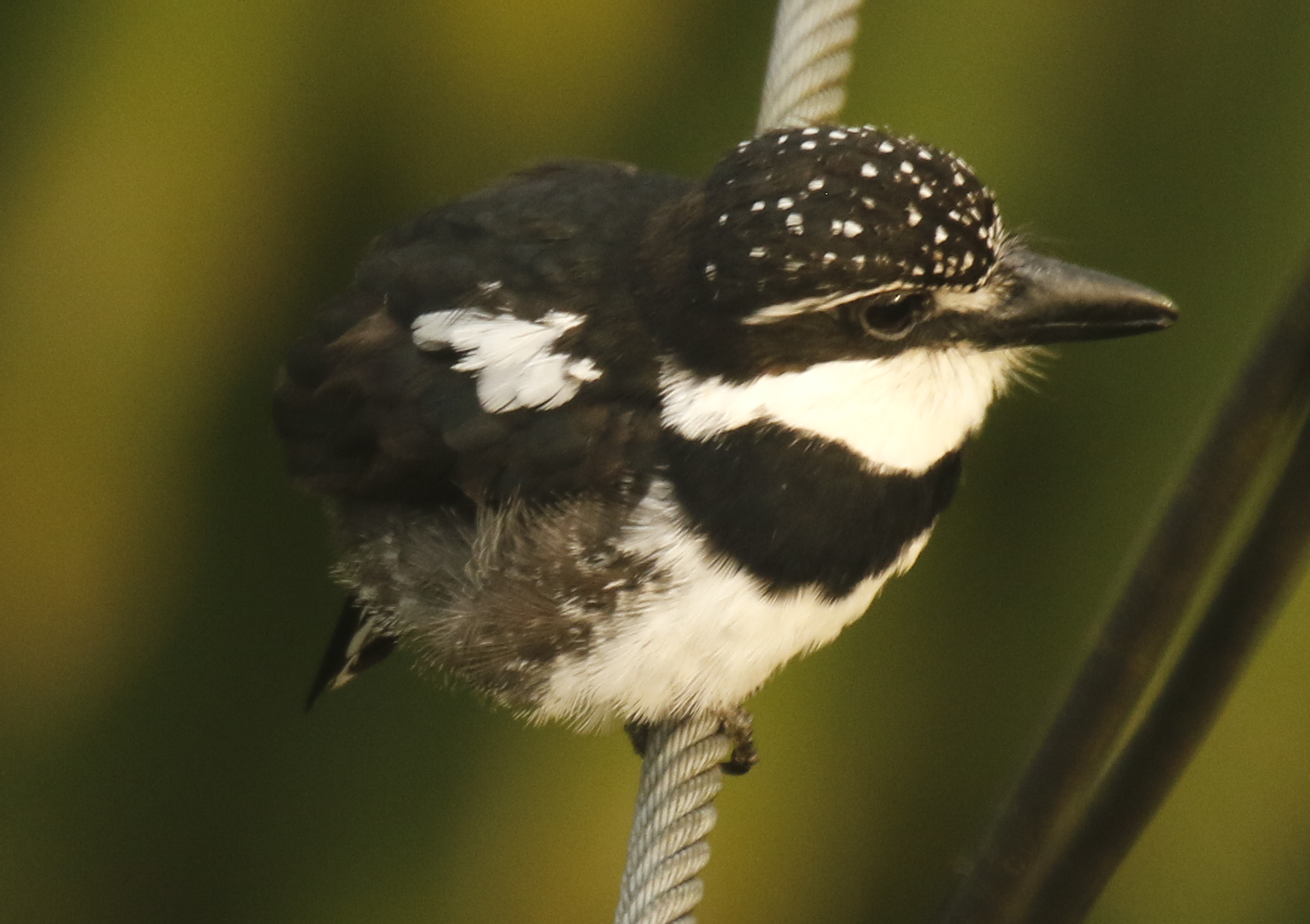
Sacha Lodge, Ecuador
