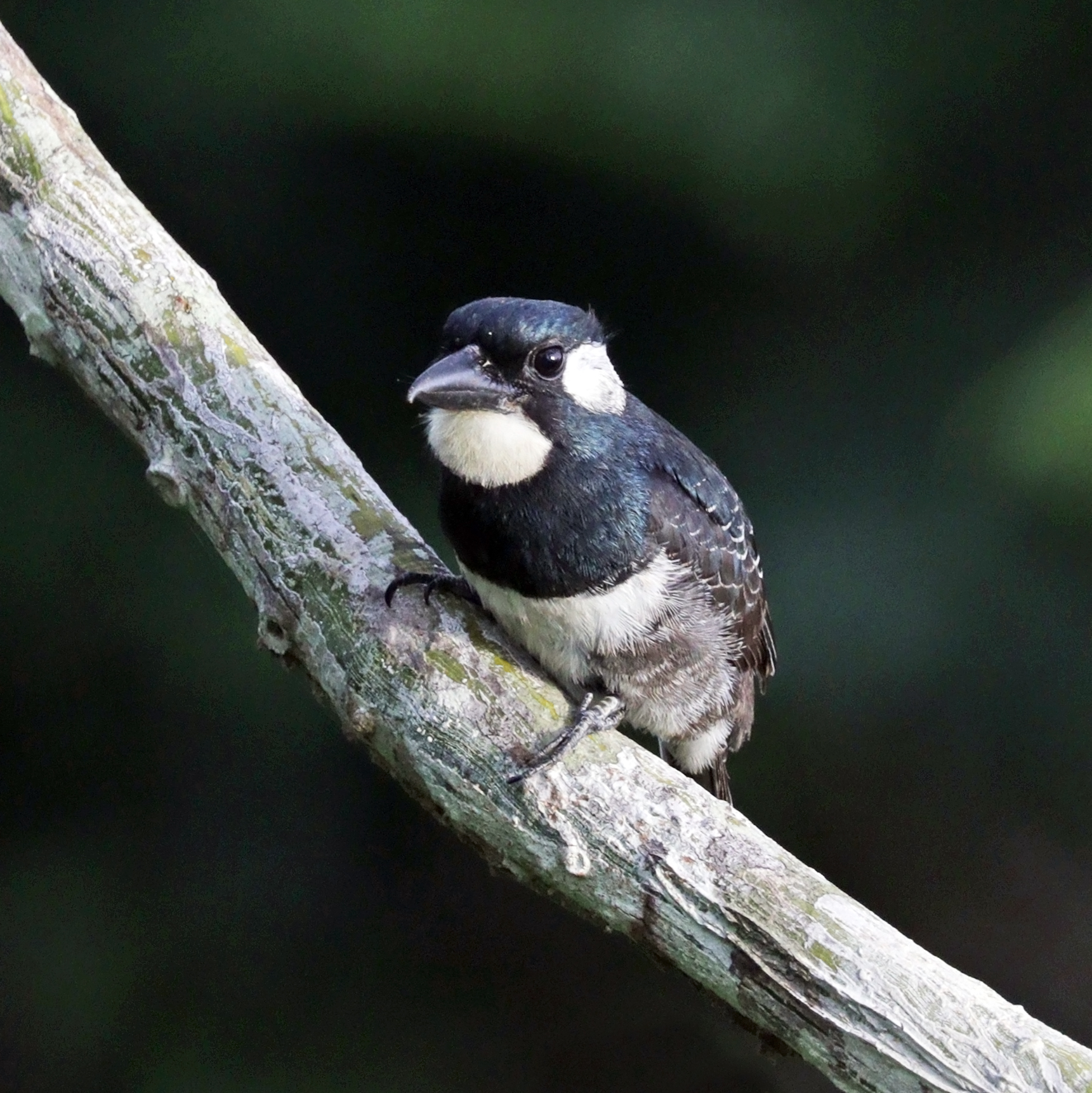

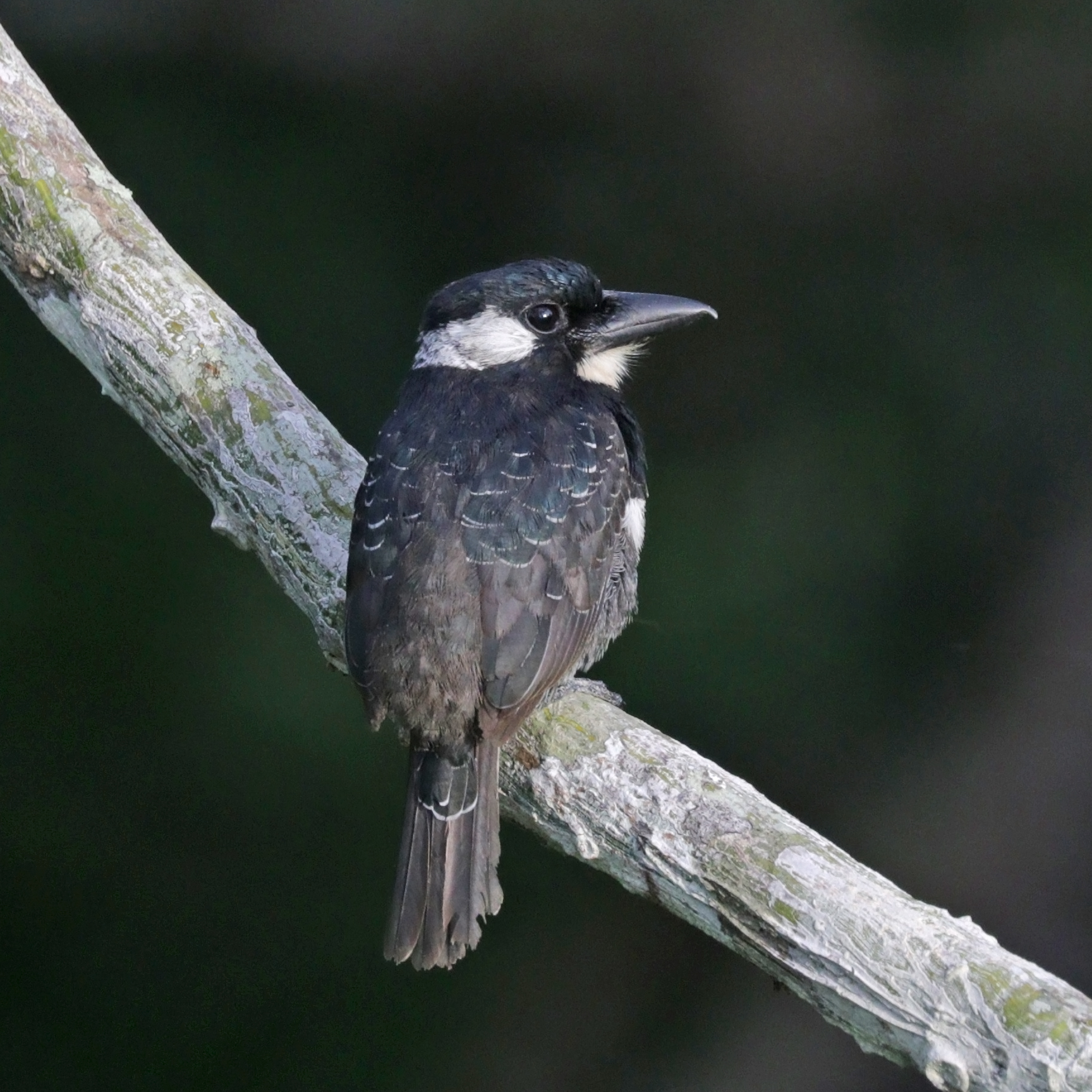
- In Panama

Conservation status
- Least Concern (IUCN 3.1)

Scientific classification
- Kingdom: Animalia
- Phylum: Chordata
- Class: Aves
- Order: Piciformes
- Family: Bucconidae
- Genus: Notharchus
- Species: N. pectoralis

Binomial name
- Notharchus pectoralis (Gray, 1846)

= Black-breasted puffbird =

Species of bird

The black-breasted puffbird (Notharchus pectoralis) is a species of bird in the family Bucconidae, the puffbirds, nunlets, and nunbirds. It is found in Colombia, Ecuador, and Panama.

== Taxonomy and systematics ==
The black-breasted puffbird is monotypic. It is closely related to the brown-banded puffbird (N. ordii) and some authors have proposed that they form a superspecies.

== Description ==
The black-breasted puffbird is 19 to 23 cm (7.5 to 9.1 in) long and weighs between 60 and 69 g (2.1 and 2.4 oz). The plumage is mostly glossy blue-black, with a white collar, cheeks, throat, and belly, a blue-black breast band, and a black tail with white tips on the feathers. The closed wing and rump show narrow white scallops. The flanks are dark gray with buffy marks. The heavy bill is black, as are the feet, and the iris of the eye is dark brown or red. The two sexes are the same, and the plumage of juvenile birds has not been described.

== Distribution and habitat ==
The black-breasted puffbird is found from the Canal Zone of Panama east into central Colombia and south through western Colombia into northwestern Ecuador. It inhabits humid lowland rainforest and secondary forest from sea level to 1,000 m (3,300 ft). It is seldom found near forest edges, and is more restricted to forests than its close relatives, but is often found near running water. It is usually found in the canopy, but will descend to the forest floor to pursue prey flushed by army ant swarms.

== Behavior ==
=== Feeding ===
The black-breasted puffbird hunts from a perch by diving on its prey and will also follow army ant swarms. It beats its catch on the perch before eating it. It takes a range of prey species, including centipedes and millipedes, scorpions, spiders, cockroaches, mantises, grasshoppers, beetles, and lizards.

=== Breeding ===
The black-breasted puffbird's breeding season spans from March to May in Colombia and March to July in Panama. Both parents excavate the nesting burrow in an arboreal termitarium, typically from 2.3 to 12.5 m (7.5 to 41 ft) high. The clutch size is three eggs, but no more than two fledged young from a brood have been observed. Both parents incubate the eggs.

=== Vocalization ===
The black-breasted puffbird's song is "10–30 loud 'kwee' whistles followed by 3 or so lower, slower 'whew' whistles ending with a few fading 'wheet-whew' wolf-whistles". It also makes a "rasping 'chah-chah-chah'" call when disputing territory.

== Status ==
The IUCN has assessed the black-breasted puffbird as being of Least Concern. It has a large range and a population of at least 50,000 mature individuals, though the latter is believed to be decreasing. The species is generally uncommon, but may be overlooked frequently due to its habit of remaining motionless for hours. Habitat disturbance is a threat.
