= Aztec fruit-eating bat =

Conservation status
- Least Concern (IUCN 3.1)

Scientific classification
- Kingdom: Animalia
- Phylum: Chordata
- Class: Mammalia
- Order: Chiroptera
- Family: Phyllostomidae
- Genus: Dermanura
- Species: D. azteca

Binomial name
- Dermanura azteca K. Andersen, 1906
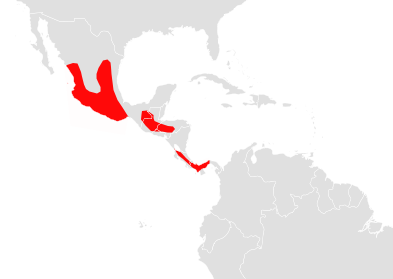
- Aztec fruit-eating bat range

Synonyms
- Artibeus aztecus K. Andersen, 1906

Species of bat

The Aztec fruit-eating bat (Dermanura azteca) is a species of bat in the family Phyllostomidae.

== Taxonomy and etymology ==
It was described as a new species in 1906 by Danish mammalogist Knud Andersen. The holotype was collected by Edward William Nelson in Tetela del Volcán, Mexico. Its species name "aztecus" refers to the indigenous Aztecs of Mexico, where this species was first documented.

== Description ==
It is one of the largest members of its genus and lacks a tail. It has a forearm length of 35–41 mm (1.4–1.6 in) and body weight of 18–24 g (0.63–0.85 oz). Its dental formula is 2.1.2.22.1.2.2 for a total of 28 teeth.

== Biology and ecology ==
It is nocturnal, foraging at night and roosting in sheltered places such as abandoned mines, old wells, and tree branches during the day. It eats fruits from plant species such as Crataegus mexicana and Prunus serotina and cones from species such as Cupressus and Juniperus. Additionally, it will consume insects.

== Range and habitat ==
It is found in several countries in Central America including Costa Rica, El Salvador, Guatemala, Honduras, Mexico, and Panama. It has been documented at elevations from 600–3,000 m (2,000–9,800 ft) above sea level; in Mexico, it is most frequently encountered at approximately 2,000 m (6,600 ft) above sea level.
