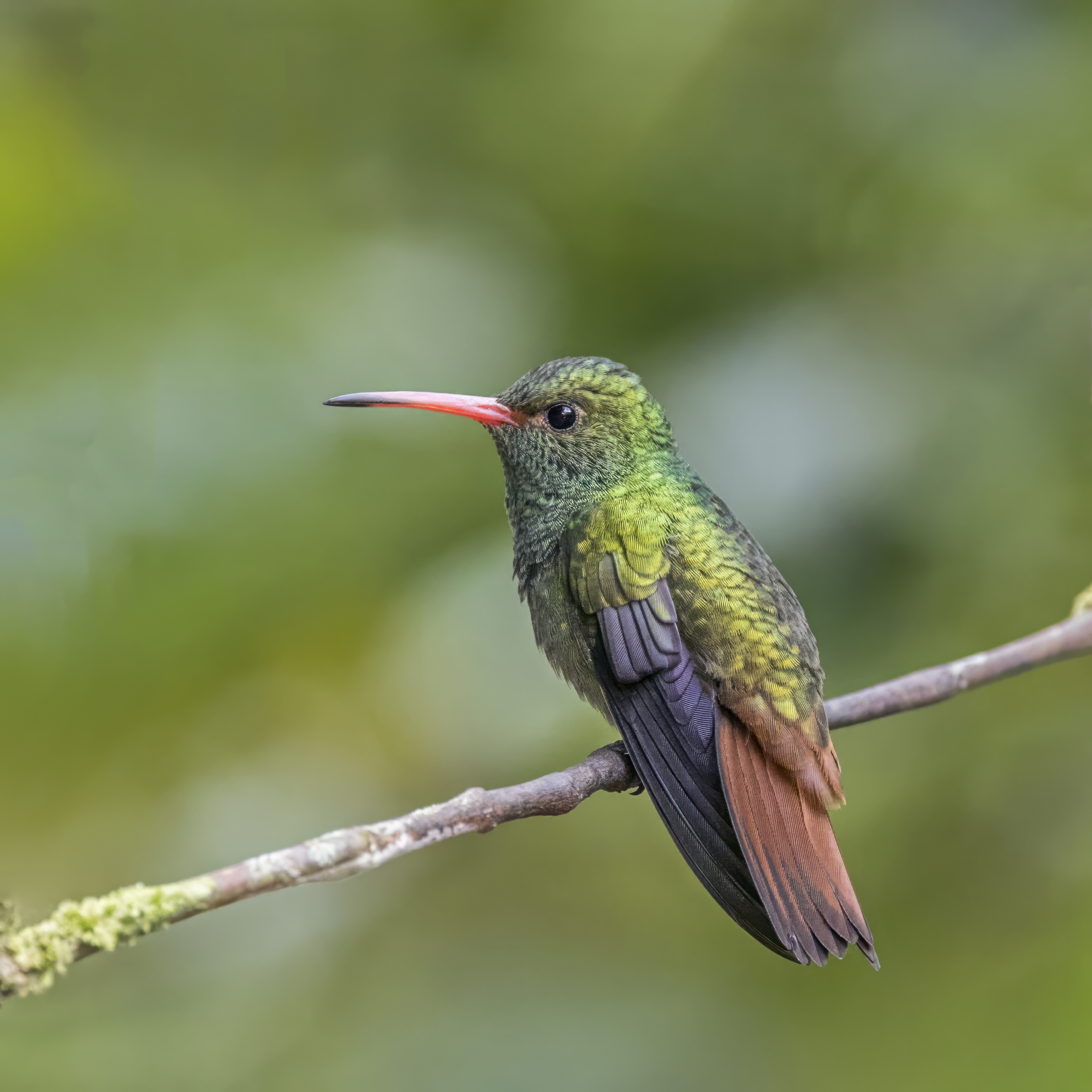
- Male A. t. fuscicaudata, Colombia

Conservation status
- Least Concern (IUCN 3.1)
- CITES Appendix II

Scientific classification
- Kingdom: Animalia
- Phylum: Chordata
- Class: Aves
- Order: Apodiformes
- Family: Trochilidae
- Genus: Amazilia
- Species: A. tzacatl

Binomial name
- Amazilia tzacatl (de la Llave, 1833)
- Range

= Rufous-tailed hummingbird =

Species of bird

The rufous-tailed hummingbird (Amazilia tzacatl) is a medium-sized hummingbird in the "emeralds", tribe Trochilini of subfamily Trochilinae. It is found from east-central Mexico through Central America and Colombia into Ecuador and Venezuela.

== Taxonomy ==
The rufous-tailed hummingbird was formally described in 1833 by the Mexican naturalist Pablo de La Llave. He placed it in the genus Trochlilus and coined the binomial name Trochilus tzacatl. The rufous-tailed hummingbird is now placed in the genus Amazilia and was introduced in 1843 by the French naturalist René Lesson. The genus name comes from the Inca heroine in Jean-François Marmontel's novel Les Incas, ou la destruction de l'Empire du Pérou. The specific epithet is from Aztec mythology: Tzacatl was a warrior chief.

The rufous-tailed hummingbird has these five recognized subspecies:

- A. t. tzacatl (La Llave, 1833)
- A. t. handleyi Wetmore, 1963
- A. t. fuscicaudata (Fraser, 1840)
- A. t. brehmi Weller & Schuchmann, 1999
- A. t. jucunda (Heine, 1863)

A. t. handleyi was originally described as a separate species, the Escudo hummingbird. At least one author treated the rufous-tailed hummingbird and the chestnut-bellied hummingbird (Saucerottia castaneiventris) as a superspecies; the latter was included in the genus Amazilia at that time, but the two are now known to not be closely related. Some authors have doubted that A. t. fuscicaudata should be a separate subspecies.

== Description ==
The rufous-tailed hummingbird is 9 to 11 cm (3.5 to 4.3 in) long and weighs approximately 5 g (0.18 oz). The adult male of the nominate subspecies has a green head and upperparts except for chestnut-brown lores and uppertail coverts. The tail is also mostly chestnut-brown, giving the species its English name; the feathers' outer webs and tips are bronze green. The throat, upper breast, and sides are green; the throat feathers sometimes have thin white edges giving a scalloped effect. The lower breast is gray, the belly white, and the undertail coverts chestnut-brown. The adult female's lower breast is a paler gray than the male's and the scalloping on the throat is more pronounced. Juveniles have a cinnamon wash to the lower breast and sides and the feathers of the lower back and rump have narrow cinnamon tips. The outer half of the bill's maxilla is black and the inner half red; the mandible is red with a black tip.

The song is "varied, high, thin, squeaky chirping, tsi, tsi-tsi-tsit tsi-tsitsi tsi-si-si." Its calls are "a fairly hard, smacking tchik-tchik...or...tchi tchi..., at times repeated insistently" and "dry, hard chips often run into a rattling chirr-rr-rr-rr-rr".

A. t. handleyi has the same color pattern as the nominate but is significantly larger and darker. A. t. fuscicaudata is smaller than the nominate and has a shorter and stouter bill. A. t. jucunda's maxilla is pinkish brown rather than black; its belly is a darker gray than the nominate's and the bronze green on the tail is narrower. A. t. brehmi is similar to jucunda and fuscicaudata but has longer wings and tail. It has a longer bill than fuscicaudata and reduced green on the tail like jucunda.

== Distribution and habitat ==
The subspecies of the rufous-tailed hummingbird are found thus:

- A. t. tzacatl, from the eastern Mexican states of Veracruz and Oaxaca south through Belize, Guatemala, Honduras, Nicaragua, and Costa Rica into most of Panama (It apparently skips El Salvador.)
- A. t. handleyi, Isla Escudo de Veraguas off the Caribbean coast of northwestern Panama
- A. t. fuscicaudata, the Cauca River and Magdalena River valleys of northern and western Colombia east into western Venezuela's Lara and Táchira states
- A. t. brehmi, the upper Güiza River in Colombia's Nariño Department
- A. t. jucunda, from Chocó Department in western Colombia south through western Ecuador to Loja Province

The South American Classification Committee (SACC) of the American Ornithological Society extends the range of A. t. jucunda into Peru.

The rufous-tailed hummingbird inhabits open, non-forested, landscapes such as clearings, gardens, and the edges of forest. It is also found in low, young, brushy, secondary forests. It frequently comes to feeders. In elevation, the rufous-tailed hummingbird ranges from sea level to 1,200 m (3,900 ft) in Mexico, to 1,850 m (6,100 ft) in Costa Rica, 1,800 m (5,900 ft) in Colombia, and 1,700 m (5,600 ft) in Venezuela. It is found as high as 2,500 m (8,200 ft) in Ecuador but that elevation is thought to be local or seasonal.

== Behavior ==
=== Feeding ===
Like most hummingbirds, the rufous-tailed feeds on nectar and small insects. It is common at sugar water feeders and often seen in coffee and banana plantations. It is extremely territorial and aggressive at feeding sites such as flower patches and feeders, from which it chases other hummingbirds and large insects.

=== Breeding ===
The rufous-tailed hummingbird is polygynous. Though it is aggressive while feeding, the species sometimes nests in loose colonies. Its breeding season varies widely across its range but is within the February to November span. The female is entirely responsible for nest building, incubation of eggs, and care of nestlings. She lays two white eggs in a compact cup nest constructed from plant fibers, leaves, and spiderwebs covered with lichens and mosses. It is typically placed up to 6 m (20 ft) high on a thin horizontal twig. Incubation takes 15 to 19 days, and fledging another 18 to 22 days.

== Status ==
The IUCN has assessed the rufous-tailed hummingbird as being of Least Concern. It has a very large range and a population estimated at more than five million mature individuals, though that number is thought to be decreasing. The species might actually benefit from human activity, as deforestation provides open spaces. The species frequents coffee and banana plantations and readily comes to feeders.

== Gallery ==
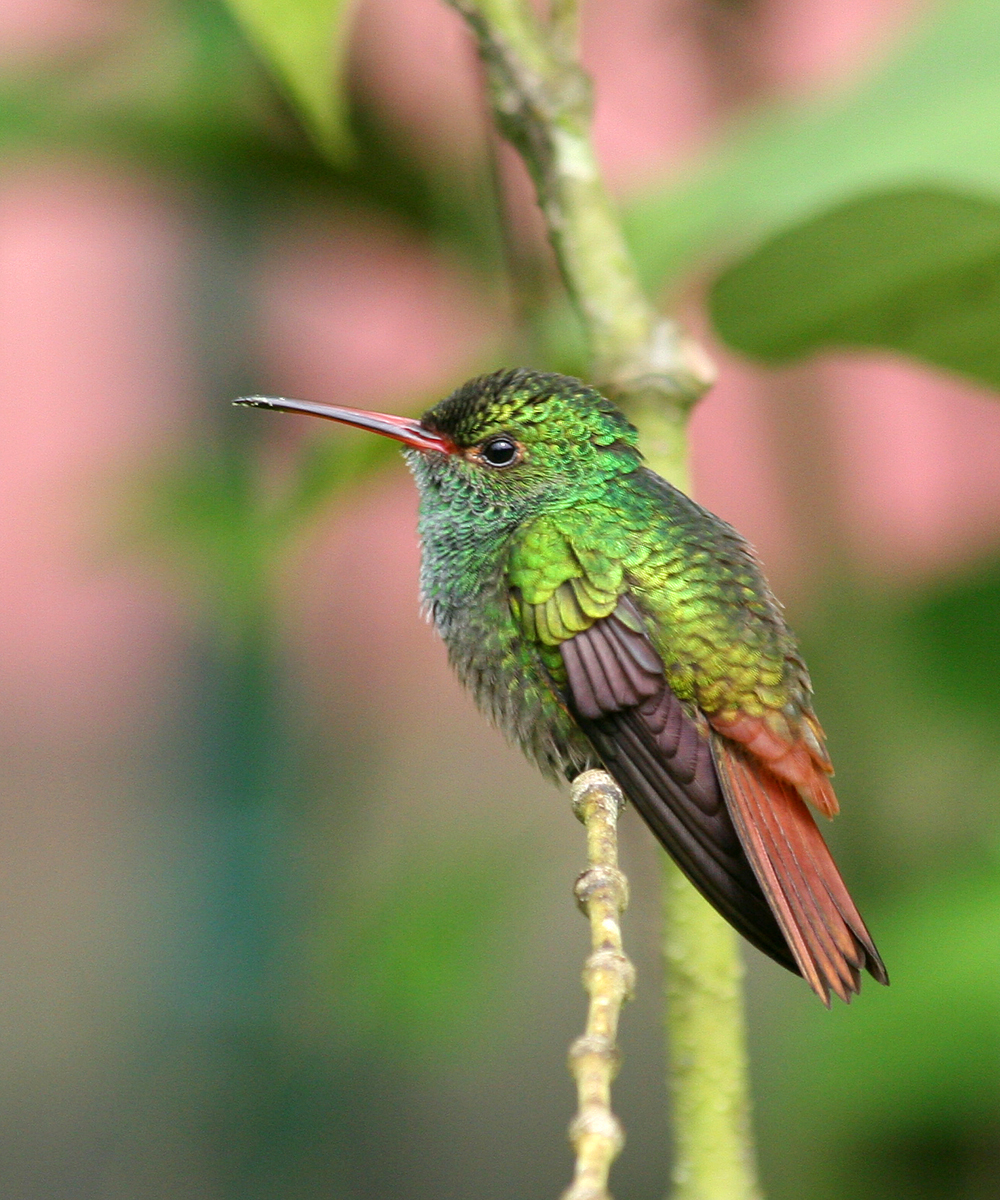
Rufous-tailed hummingbird in Costa Rica

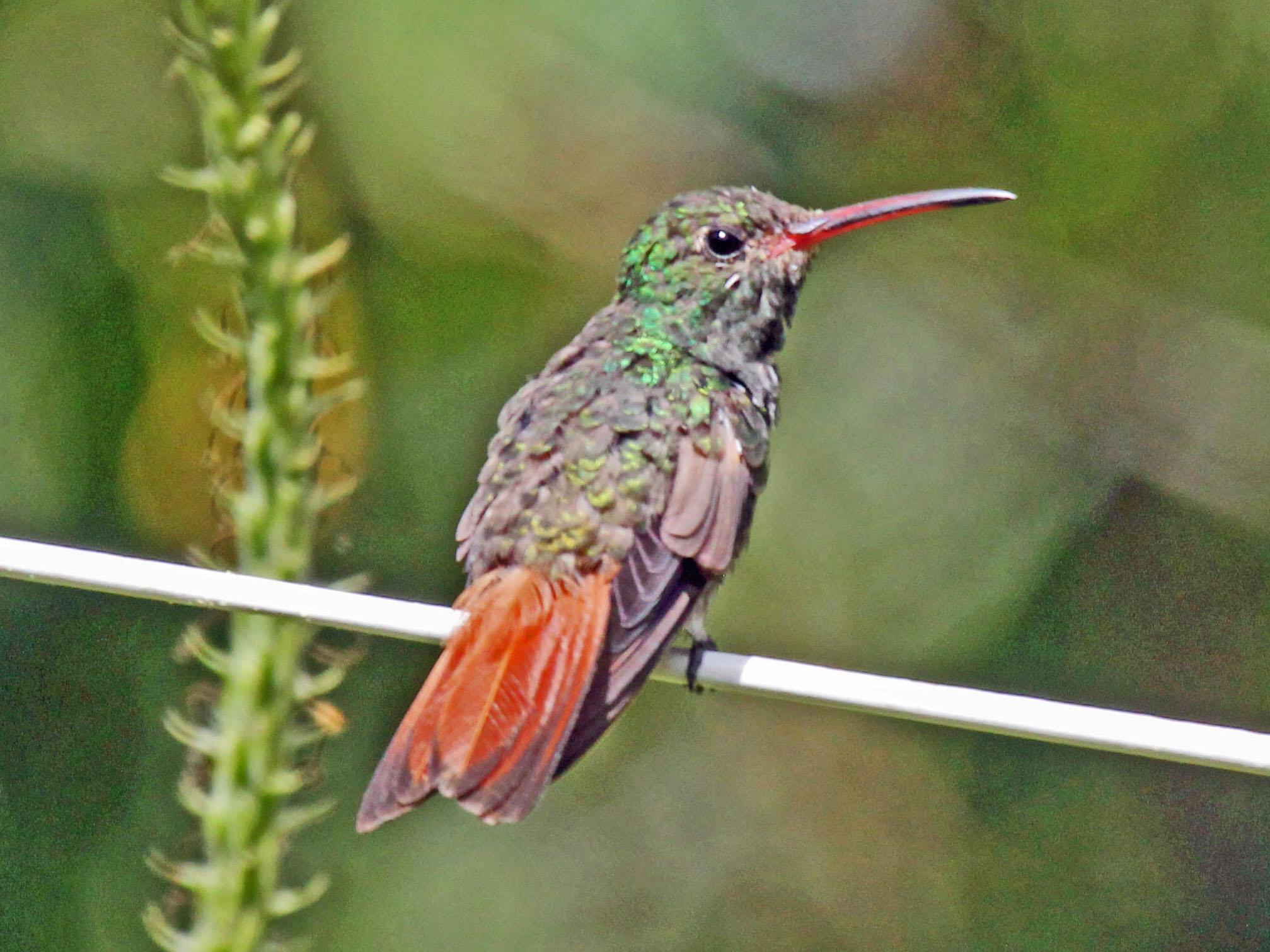
Rufous-tailed hummingbird in Panama

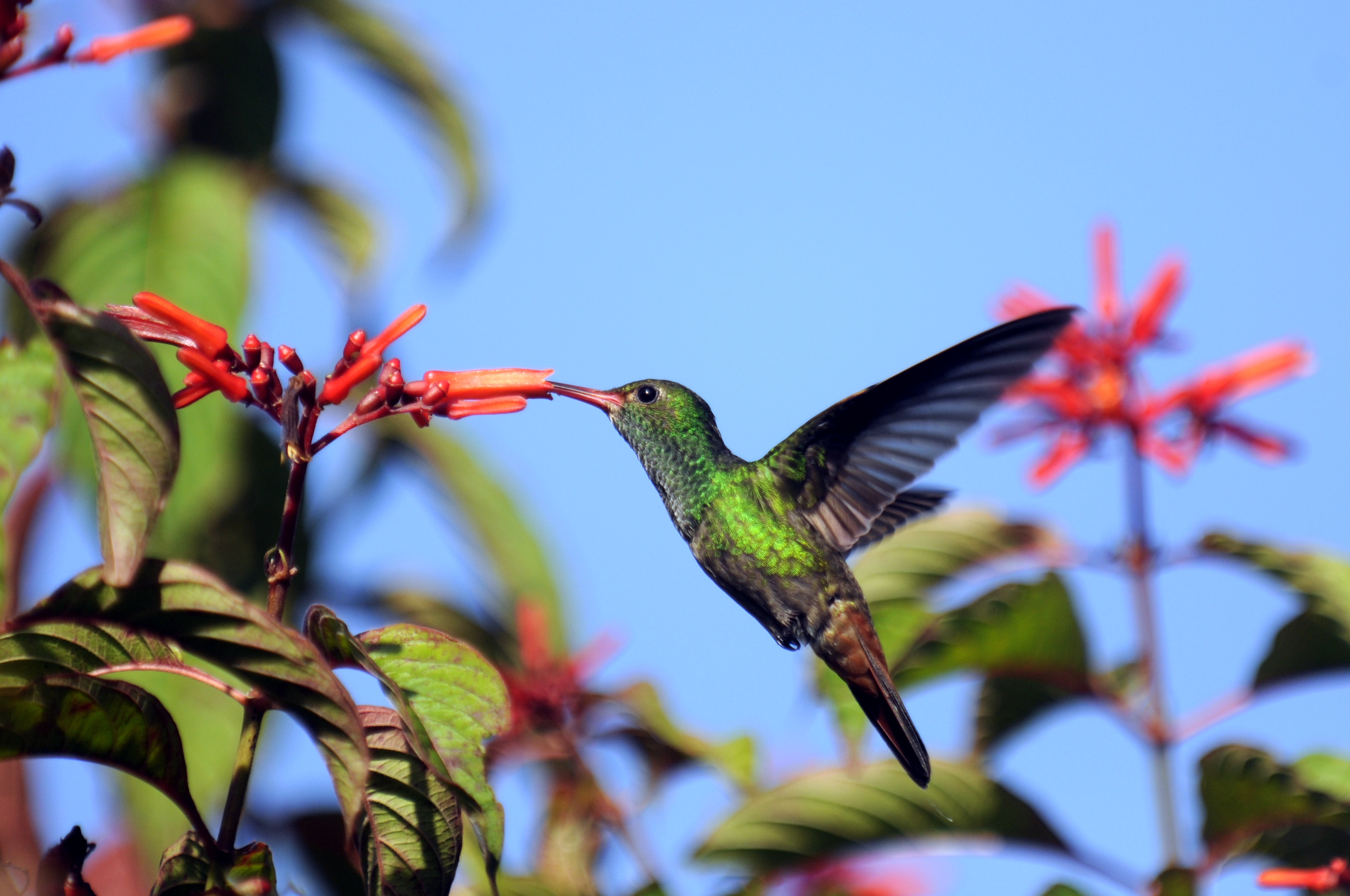
At La Selva, Costa Rica

At Montes de Oca, Costa Rica, thoroughly enjoying the heavy rain from the thunderstorm.
