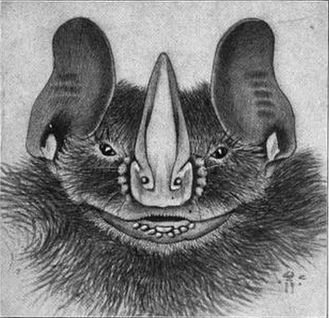

Conservation status
- Least Concern (IUCN 3.1)

Scientific classification
- Kingdom: Animalia
- Phylum: Chordata
- Class: Mammalia
- Order: Chiroptera
- Family: Phyllostomidae
- Genus: Dermanura
- Species: D. glauca

Binomial name
- Dermanura glauca Thomas, 1893

Synonyms
- Artibeus glaucus, Thomas 1893

= Silver fruit-eating bat =

Species of bat

The silver fruit-eating bat (Dermanura glauca) is a South American bat species of the family Phyllostomidae.

== Description ==
The silver fruit-eating bat is a small bat, measuring only 4 to 6 cm (1.6 to 2.4 in) in head-body length and weighing 10 to 14 g (0.35 to 0.49 oz). It has dark brown fur which varies little over the body, with faint stripes of paler fur above each eye. Unlike many closely related species found in the same area, the edges of the ears and nose-leaf are said to be bright yellow in colour.

== Distribution and biology ==
Silver fruit-eating bats are found across the northern Andes, from Colombia to Bolivia. They inhabit lowland to mid altitude forested terrain between 200 and 2,000 m (660 and 6,560 ft). They feed on fruits found in the canopy of tropical to temperate forests and roost under cut leaves of banana or palm trees during the day. They breed throughout the year, but with two distinct peaks.

There are no recognised subspecies, although this was not the case prior to 2008, when the Bogota fruit-eating bat (Dermanura bogotensis), of Venezuela and the Guianas, was raised to full species status.
