= Isla Escudo de Veraguas =

Caribbean island belonging to Panama

Coordinates: 9°05′51″N 81°33′29″W

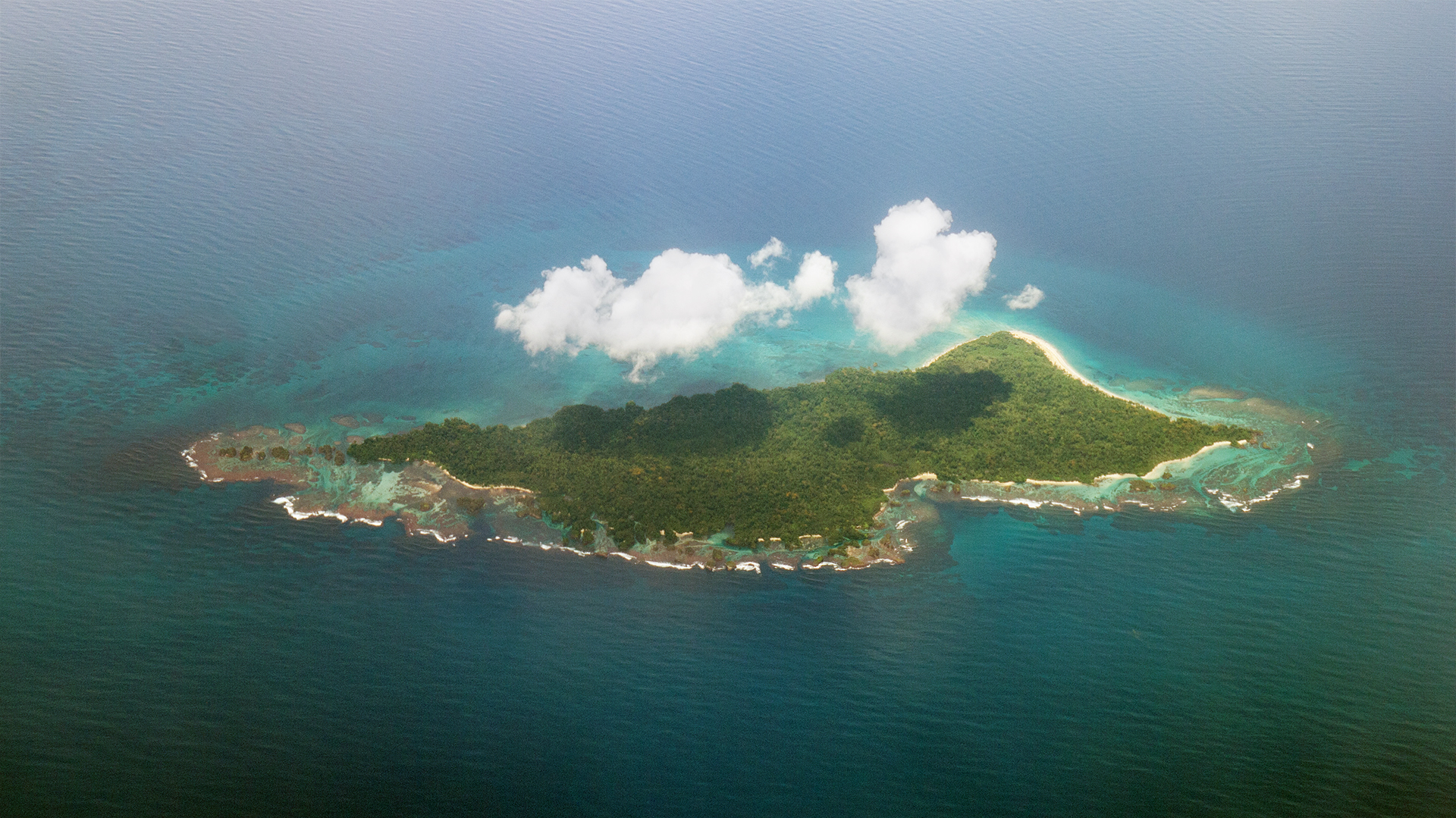
Isla Escudo de Veraguas

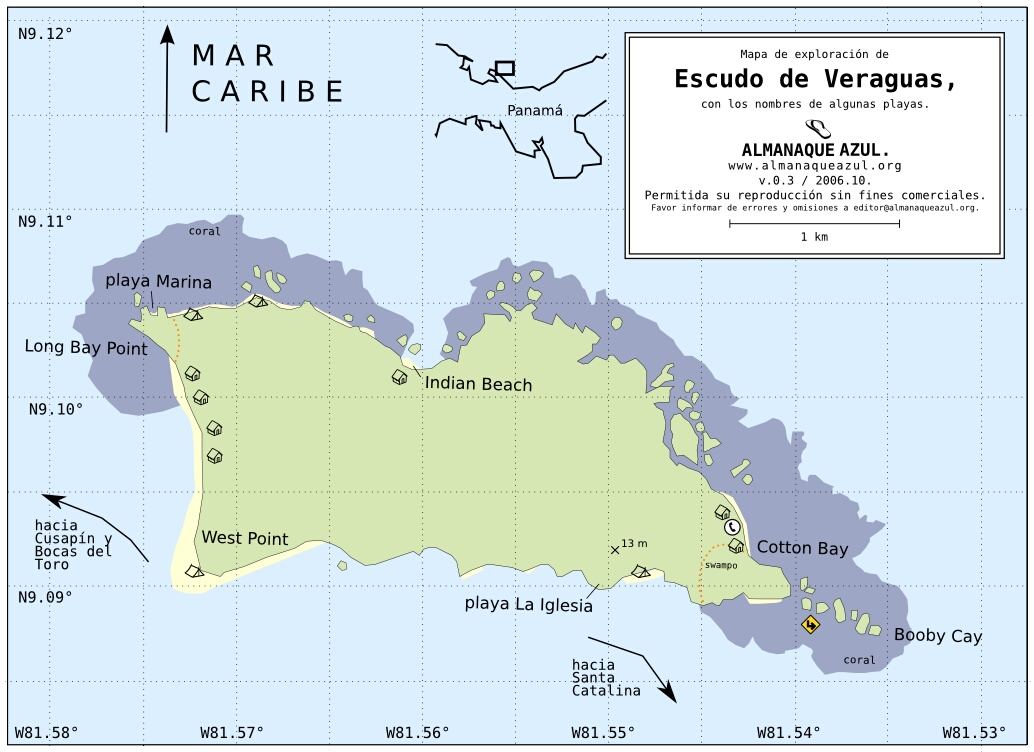
Map of Isla Escudo de Veraguas

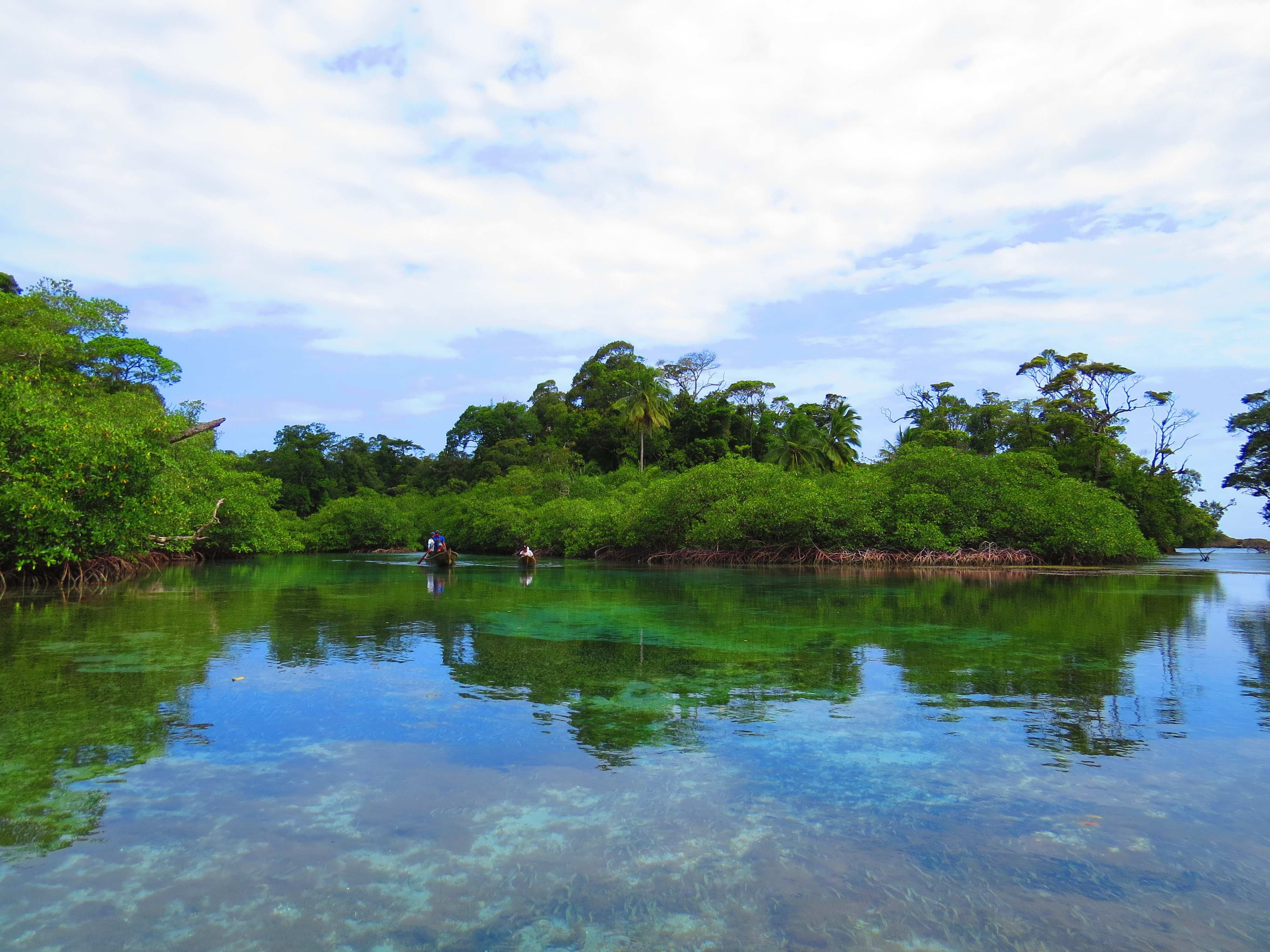

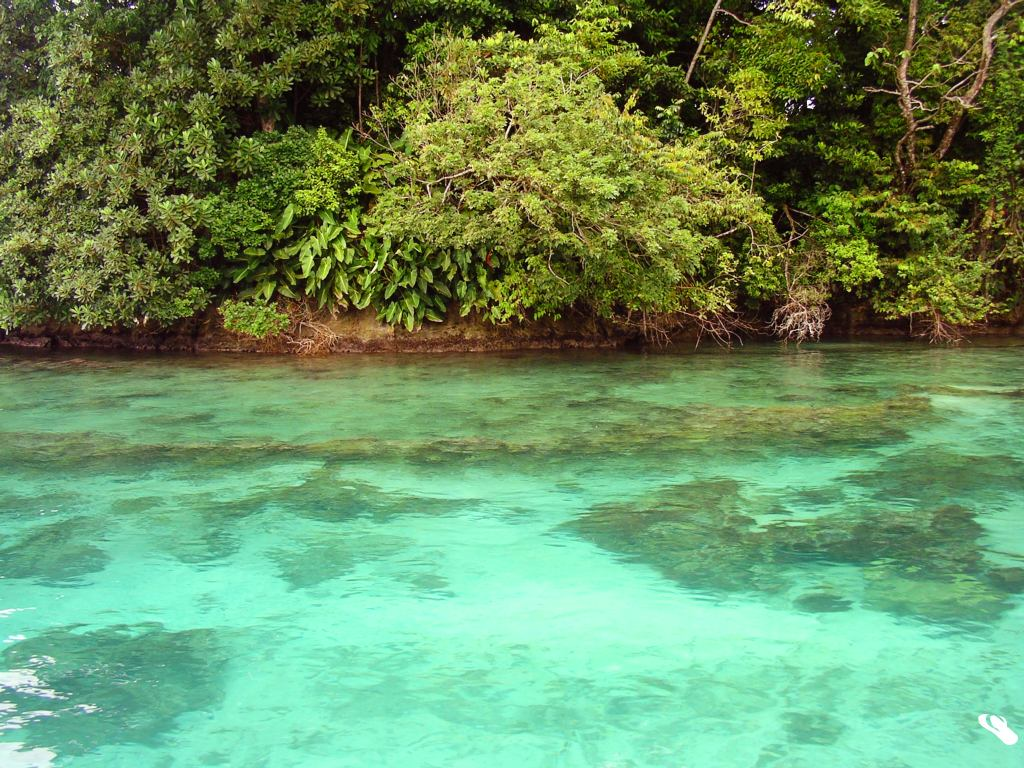

Isla Escudo de Veraguas is a small (4.3 km^{2}) isolated Caribbean island of the Republic of Panama. Despite its name, it is not part of the province of Veraguas, but rather Bocas del Toro. The island is located about an hour away from Rio Caña, an Indigenous Ngäbe-Buglé community that is part of a recently established tourism network in Panama.

== Environment ==
The island has 11 ha (27 acres) of mangrove forest and 100 ha (250 acres) of coral reef with 55 types of coral. It houses over 11,000 species. Although located only 17 km from the coastline in the Golfo de los Mosquitos and isolated for only about 9000 years, several animals found on the island are distinct from their mainland counterparts, and two mammals are recognized as being endemic to the island: a subspecies of Thomas's fruit-eating bat and the pygmy three-toed sloth. These and the worm salamander Oedipina maritima are considered to be critically endangered due to their restricted range.

Other mammals found on the island include Pallas's long-tongued bat, little big-eared bat, silky short-tailed bat, riparian myotis, lesser sac-winged bat, the armored rat, and Derby's woolly opossum.

The island has been designated an Important Bird Area (IBA) by BirdLife International because it supports significant populations of white-crowned pigeons and rufous-tailed hummingbirds.

== History ==
Escudo de Veraguas is traditionally considered the birthplace of the Ngöbe–Buglé people. Until 1995 the island remained largely unpopulated, but since that time Ngöbe–Buglé fishermen from nearby coastal towns moved in, first using the island as a base for fishing parties and later settling permanently. In 2012, about 120 fishermen and their families were settled on the island.

== Literature cited ==
- Anderson, R. P.; Handley, C. O. Jr (2001-04-19). "A new species of three-toed sloth (Mammalia: Xenarthra) from Panama, with a review of the genus Bradypus" (PDF). Proceedings of the Biological Society of Washington. 114 (1): 1–33. Archived from the original (PDF) on 2010-06-13.
- Anderson, R. P.; Handley, C. O. Jr (May 2002). "Dwarfism in insular sloths: biogeography, selection, and evolutionary rate". Evolution. 56 (5): 1045–1058. doi:10.1111/j.0014-3820.2002.tb01415.x. PMID 12093018.
- Kalko, E. K. V.; Handley, C. E. (1994). "Evolution, biogeography, and description of a new species of fruit-eating bat, genus Artibeus Leach (1821), from Panamá". Zeitschrift für Säugetierkunde. 59 (5): 257–273.
