= Andersen's fruit-eating bat =

Conservation status
- Least Concern (IUCN 3.1)

Scientific classification
- Kingdom: Animalia
- Phylum: Chordata
- Class: Mammalia
- Order: Chiroptera
- Family: Phyllostomidae
- Genus: Dermanura
- Species: D. anderseni

Binomial name
- Dermanura anderseni Osgood, 1916

Synonyms
- Artibeus anderseni Osgood, 1916

Species of bat

Andersen's fruit-eating bat (Dermanura anderseni) is a species of bat found in South America.

== Taxonomy and etymology ==
It was described as a new species in 1916 by American zoologist Wilfred Hudson Osgood. The holotype had been collected in 1915 by "R. H. Becker" (likely Osgood's assistant Robert Becker) in Porto Velho, Brazil. The eponym for the species name "anderseni" is Danish mammalogist Knud Andersen. The classification of Dermanura and Artibeus has been a topic of debate, though there has been genetic and morphological evidence to reclassify the species as Artibeus aequatorialis.

== Description ==
It is a relatively small species of bat, with a forearm length of 34–36 mm (1.3–1.4 in). Its fur is dark brown on both its dorsal and ventral sides. Individuals weigh 8–12 g (0.28–0.42 oz). Its dental formula is 2.1.2.22.1.2.2 for a total of 28 teeth. It has indistinct facial stripes.

== Biology and ecology ==
It is one of relatively few species of bats that constructs "tents" out of leaves for roosting. It is likely frugivorous.

It is found in several countries in South America, including Bolivia, Brazil, Colombia, Ecuador, and Peru. It has been found at elevations up to 1,300 m (4,300 ft) above sea level.

== Conservation ==
As of 2016, it is evaluated as least concern by the IUCN.
