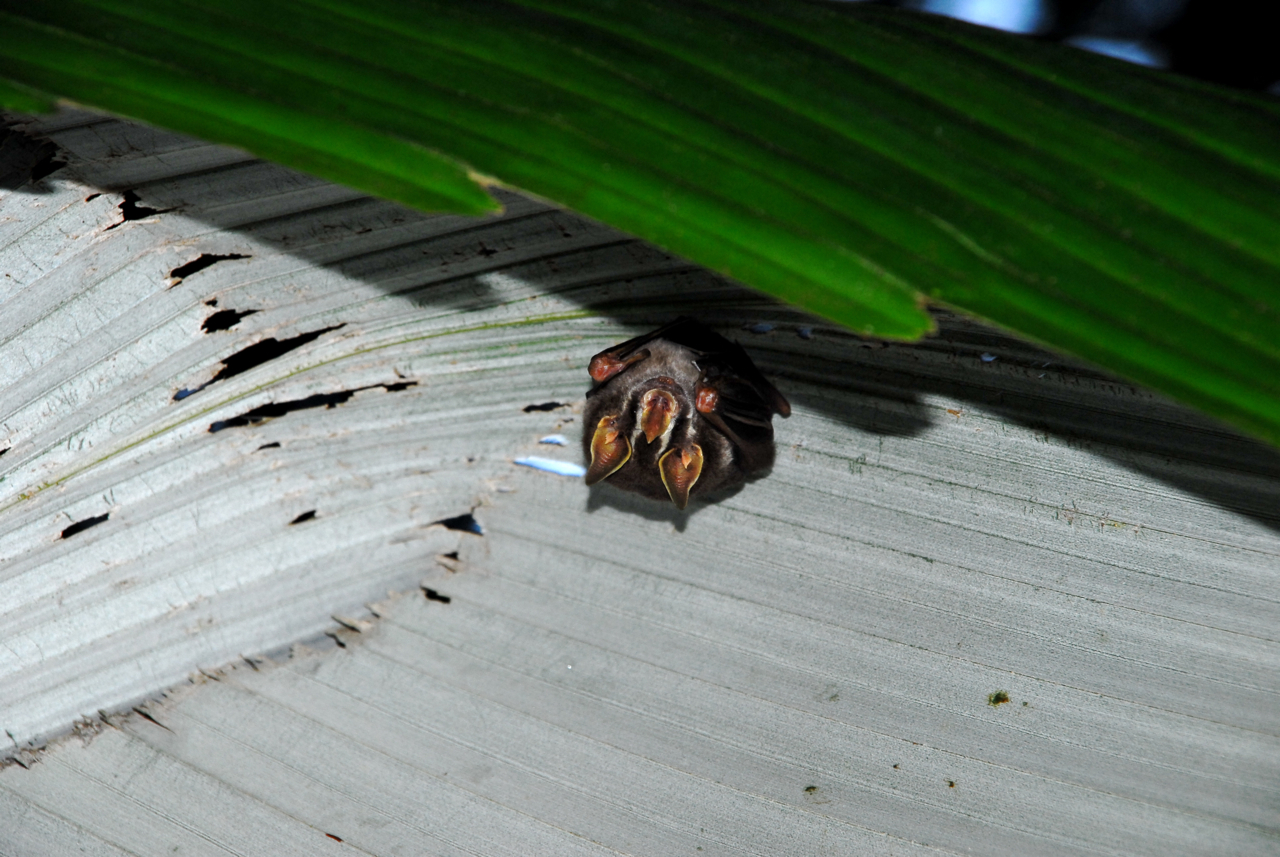

Conservation status
- Least Concern (IUCN 3.1)

Scientific classification
- Domain: Eukaryota
- Kingdom: Animalia
- Phylum: Chordata
- Class: Mammalia
- Order: Chiroptera
- Family: Phyllostomidae
- Genus: Dermanura
- Species: D. cinerea

Binomial name
- Dermanura cinerea Gervais, 1856

= Gervais's fruit-eating bat =

Species of bat

Gervais's fruit-eating bat (Dermanura cinerea) is a bat species found in Brazil, French Guiana, Guyana, eastern Peru, Suriname and eastern Venezuela.
