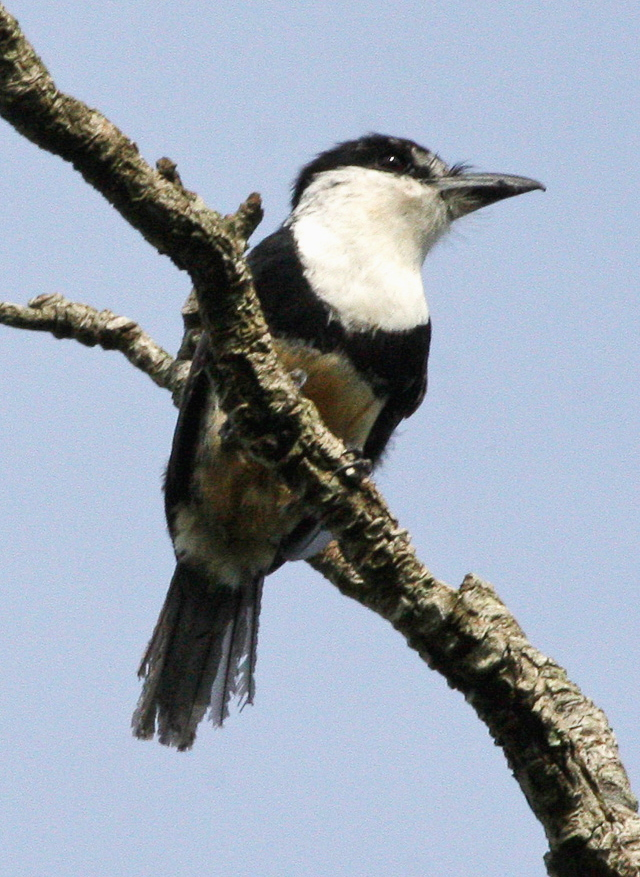

Conservation status
- Least Concern (IUCN 3.1)

Scientific classification
- Kingdom: Animalia
- Phylum: Chordata
- Class: Aves
- Order: Piciformes
- Family: Bucconidae
- Genus: Notharchus
- Species: N. swainsoni

Binomial name
- Notharchus swainsoni (Gray, 1846)

= Buff-bellied puffbird =

Species of bird

The buff-bellied puffbird (Notharchus swainsoni) is a species of bird in the family Bucconidae, the puffbirds, nunlets, and nunbirds. It is found in Argentina, Brazil, and Paraguay.

== Taxonomy and systematics ==
During the second half of the twentieth century, the buff-bellied puffbird and what are now the white-necked puffbird (N. hyperrhynchus) and Guianan puffbird (N. macrorhynchus) were treated as conspecific. It is now treated as its own monotypic species.

== Description ==
The buff-bellied puffbird is about 23.5 cm (9.3 in) long and weighs 72 to 75.6 g (2.5 to 2.7 oz). The crown and upperparts are black with a green gloss and buffy edges to the feathers. It has a narrow white forehead, throat, and upper breast. The sides of the face and a thin band around the nape are grayish white. A wide black band separates the upper breast from the buffy to pale rufous belly. The flanks are gray. Its eye color can be straw, brown, or red.

== Distribution and habitat ==
The buff-bellied puffbird is found in eastern Paraguay, far northeastern Argentina's Misiones Province, and in southeastern Brazil from southern Bahia and Espírito Santo south to Santa Catarina. It is resident in Argentina but possibly moves from other parts of its range into São Paulo state in the austral summer. It inhabits lowland humid primary and secondary forest.

== Behavior ==
=== Feeding ===
The buff-bellied puffbird hunts by sallies from a high bare perch to capture insects and sometimes small vertebrates; it also eats some fruits. It investigates army ant swarms.

=== Breeding ===
The buff-bellied puffbird breeds in September and October in the southern part of its range; the season elsewhere is not known. It excavates a nest cavity in an arboreal termitarium, and all other known breeding phenology at least for the Paraguayan subspecies is limited to one research paper.

=== Vocalization ===
The buff-bellied puffbird's song is a "descending sequence of whistles, varying in rhythm, 'ui-ui---dibule-dibule...'."

== Status ==
The IUCN has assessed the buff-bellied puffbird as being of Least Concern. It has a reasonably large range, and though its population has not been quantified it is believed to be stable. It has apparently expanded its range in Brazil since about 2000 and occurs in several protected areas.
