= Thomas van der Hammen Natural Reserve =

- Thomas van der Hammen Forest Reserve
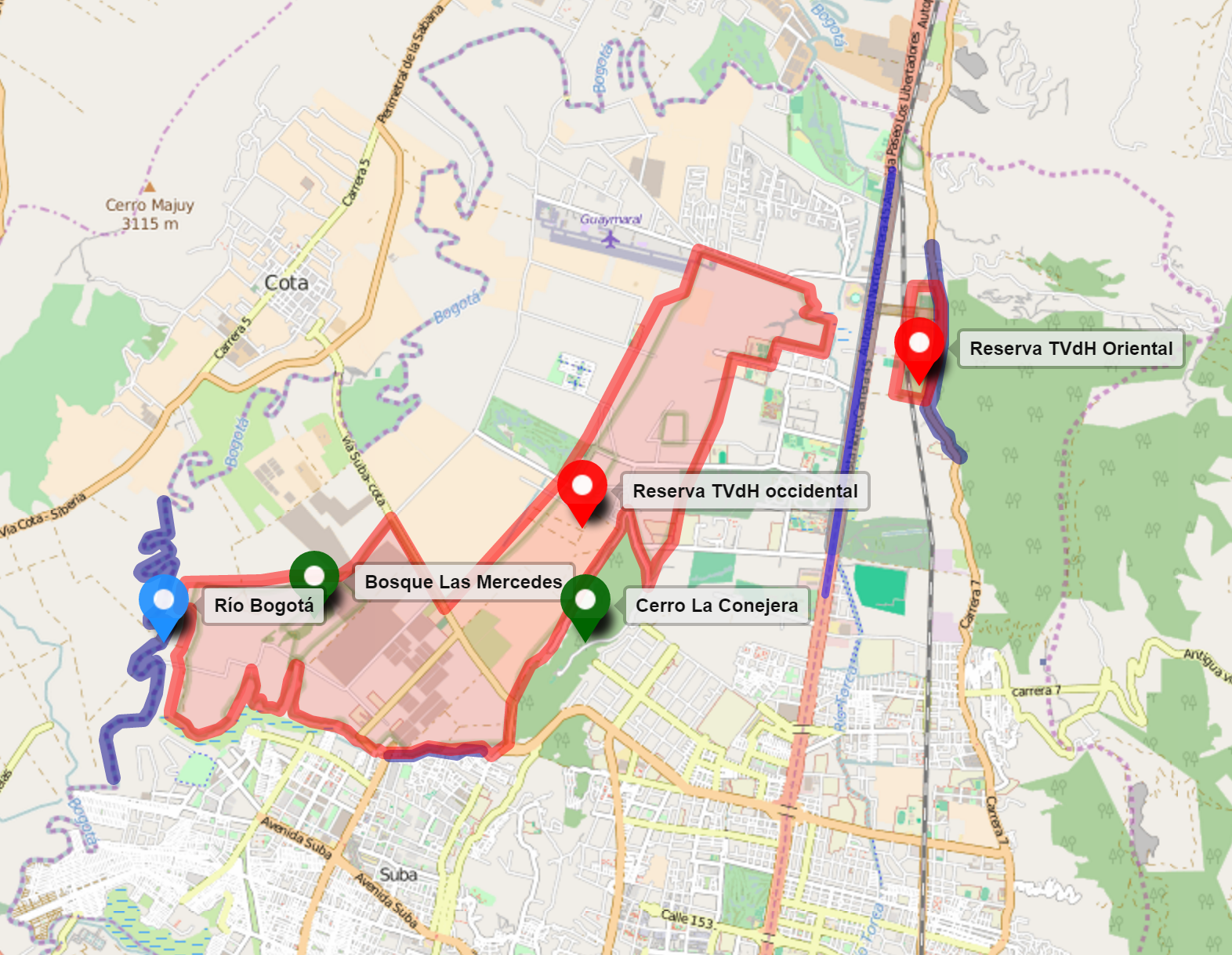
- Outline Van der Hammen Reserve in red

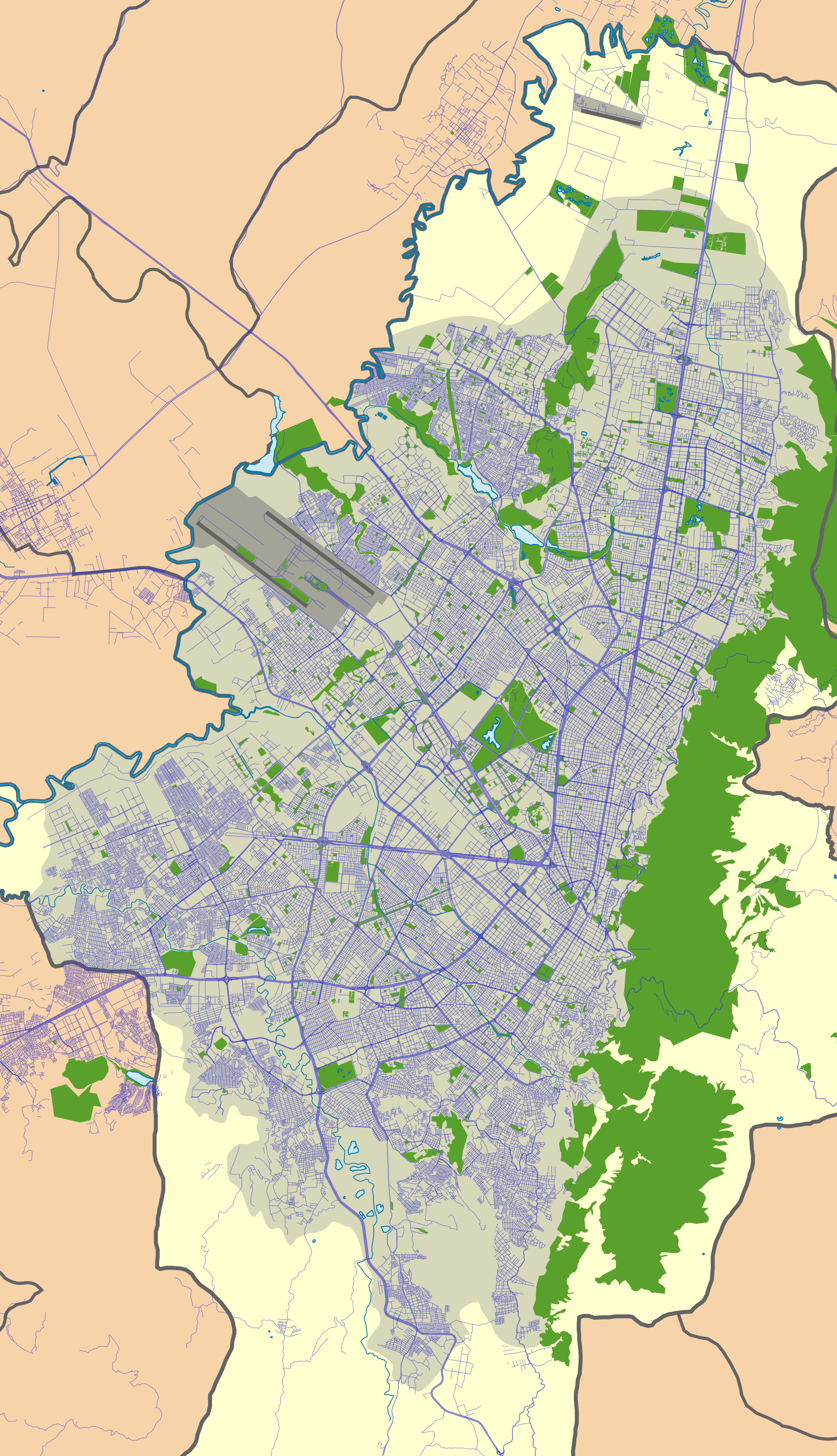
- Location within Bogotá Location within Colombia
- Location: Suba and Usaquén; Bogotá, Colombia
- Nearest town: Chía, Cota
- Coordinates: 4°46′26″N 74°05′40″W
- Area: 1,395 ha (5.39 sq mi)
- Elevation: 2,552 metres (8,373 ft)
- Established: 2000
- Named for: Thomas van der Hammen

The Thomas van der Hammen Natural Reserve or Thomas van der Hammen Forest Reserve is an area of the Bogotá savanna that is under environmental protection. The natural reserve was declared as such in year 2000 by the Ministry of Environment and Sustainable development. It takes its name from the Dutch-Colombian geologist Thomas van der Hammen who devoted his life to the research of the region. The surface area of the protected reserve is approximately 1,395 hectares (3,450 acres) and it is located in the north of Bogotá.

The protection area has the purpose of creating an urban forest that connects the Bogotá River and the Eastern Hills of Bogotá, to preserve the underground water sources, improve the quality of the air and protect the diversity and activities of the animal species that exist there.

Mayor of Bogotá Enrique Peñalosa has proposed construction in the Reserve that could host 1.5 million people.

== Flora and fauna ==
The Thomas van der Hammen Natural Reserve is a rich natural area important for the biodiversity of the Bogotá savanna. Several endemic species have been registered, and two newly described species of butterflies were discovered in the Reserve.

=== Fauna ===
==== Birds ====
In the area of the reserve 187 species of birds have been registered, some of which are endangered. Two species, registered in the past; Cistothorus apolinari and Polystictus pectoralis have not been reported recently.

Name	Species	Image
Bogotá rail	Rallus semiplumbeus	
bronze-tailed thornbill	Chalcostigma heteropogon	
rufous-browed conebill	Conirostrum rufum	
spot-flanked gallinule	Gallinula melanops	
cerulean warbler	Setophaga cerulea	
olive-sided flycatcher	Contopus cooperi	
snowy egret	Egretta thula	
noble snipe	Gallinago nobilis	
blue-throated starfrontlet	Coeligena helianthea	
coppery-bellied puffleg	Eriocnemis cupreoventris	
subtropical doradito	Pseudocolopteryx acutipennis	
pale-bellied tapaculo	Scytalopus griseicollis	
silvery-throated spinetail	Synallaxis subpudica	

==== Mammals ====
Registered mammals are among others guinea pigs, Andean white-eared opossum (Didelphis pernigra), tigrillo (Leopardus tigrinus), long-tailed weasel (Mustela frenata), and eleven species of bats.

===== Bats =====
Name	Species	Image
big brown bat	Eptesicus fuscus	
hoary bat	Lasiurus cinereus	
Mexican free-tailed bat	Tadarida brasiliensis	
Seba's short-tailed bat	Carollia perspicillata	
Geoffroy's tailless bat	Anoura geoffroyi	
Peale's free-tailed bat	Nyctinomops aurispinosus	
Wagner's bonneted bat	Eumops glaucinus	
small big-eared brown bat	Histiotus montanus	
black myotis	Myotis nigricans	
Bogotá yellow-shouldered bat	Sturnira bogotensis	
highland yellow-shouldered bat	Sturnira ludovici	

==== Butterflies ====
With 350 endemic species, Colombia occupies the first position worldwide in diversity of butterflies and after Peru, the second place in total number of registered butterfly species (3274). The Thomas van der Hammen Natural Reserve contains 23 (new studies report more than 26 with two new species in the genus Satyrinae discovered) species of butterflies. Other species of butterflies have been registered:

Name	Species	Image
American painted lady	Vanessa virginiensis	
dimera sulphur	Colias dimera	
Enyo satyr	Corades enyo	
Julia butterfly	Dryas iulia	
	Hemiargus hanno	
	Altopedaliodes cocytia	
	Lasiophila circe circe	
	Panyapedaliodes drymaea	
	Pedaliodes phaea	
	Actinote chea	
	Catasticta semiramis semiramis	
	Corades medeba	
	Leptophobia eleone eleone	
	Manerebia indirena	
	Pedaliodes fuscata	
	Pedaliodes ochrotaenia	
	Pedaliodes phoenissa	
	Pedaliodes polla	
	Pedaliodes prytanis	

== Gallery ==
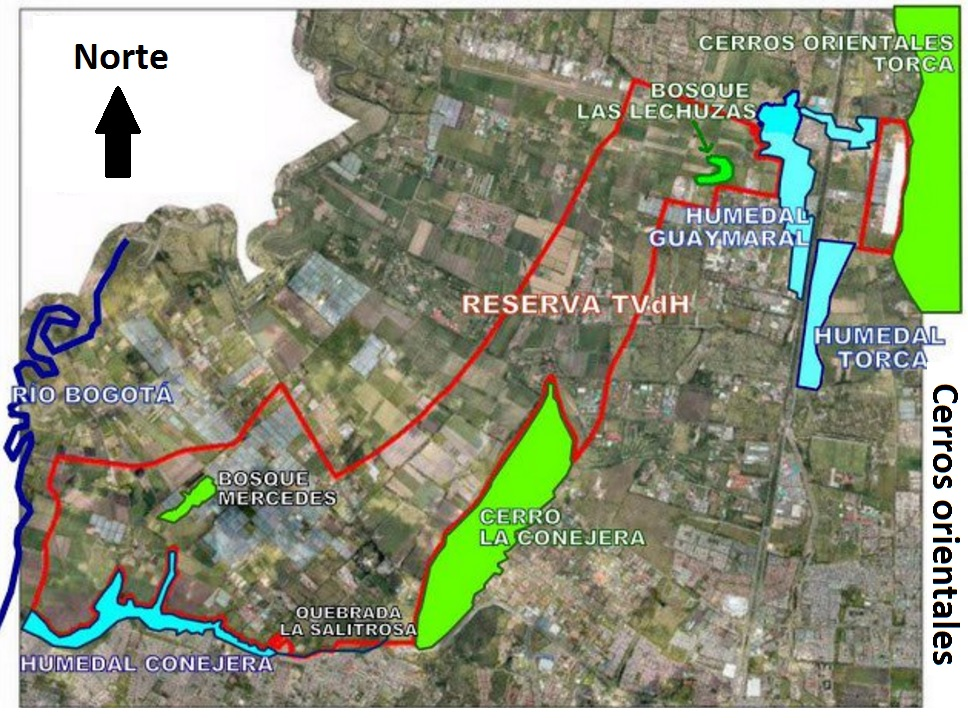
Map of the extent in 2016

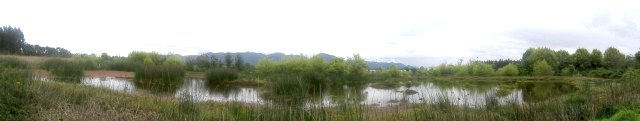
La Conejera wetland, part of the reserve

== See also ==
- Biodiversity of Colombia
- List of national parks of Colombia
- Wetlands of Bogotá
