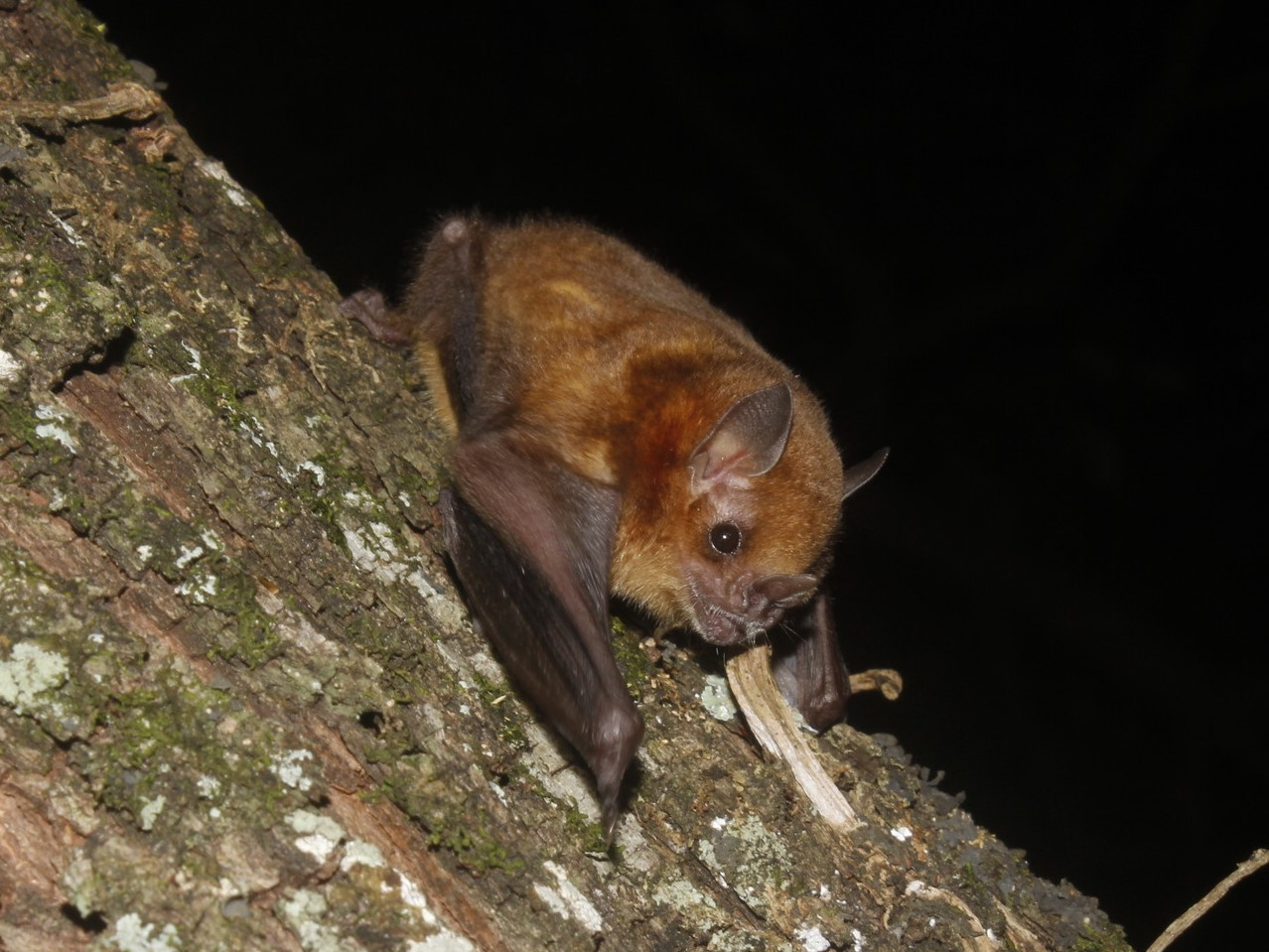

Conservation status
- Least Concern (IUCN 3.1)

Scientific classification
- Kingdom: Animalia
- Phylum: Chordata
- Class: Mammalia
- Order: Chiroptera
- Family: Phyllostomidae
- Genus: Sturnira
- Species: S. parvidens

Binomial name
- Sturnira parvidens Goldman, 1917

= Sturnira parvidens =

Species of bat

The little yellow-shouldered Mesoamerican bat (Sturnira parvidens) is a species of leaf-nosed bat found in Mexico and Central America.

== Taxonomy ==
It was described as a subspecies of the little yellow-shouldered bat (Sturnira lilium) in 1917 by American zoologist Edward Alphonso Goldman and given the trinomen S. lilium parvidens. The holotype had been collected in 1903 by Goldman and Edward William Nelson at "Papayo", given as 40 km (25 mi) northwest of Acapulco, Mexico. The species name "parvidens" derives from Latin parvus, meaning "small", and dens, meaning "tooth". The little yellow-shouldered bat has been recognized as a species complex, and some authors have considered S. parvidens as a separate species since 2000. In 2013, a genetic study further supported that it should be recognized as a full species. It forms a clade with Sturnira bakeri.

== Description ==
Sturnira parvidens is a medium-sized bat, with a head-body length of 6–7 cm (2.4–2.8 in) and weighing 12–19 g (0.42–0.67 oz). Individuals have a forearm length of approximately 41 mm (1.6 in). It has a short, broad head with large eyes and relatively short, rounded ears. It has a comparatively small nose-leaf, with an oval to lanceolate tip. The lower lip bears a central pad surrounded by a semi-circular row of wart-like structures. The main part of the wing membrane extends down to the ankles; the bat has no tail and only a vestigial tail membrane. The wings have an aspect ratio of 6 and a wing loading of 12 kg/m^{2}.

It has small teeth.

The fur is thick and soft, and can be dark grey, but is more commonly reddish or yellowish, with a distinct yellow patch over the shoulders in males. The fur of its back is dark brown, with individual hairs possessing three or four color bands. Its belly fur is paler in color with tricolored hairs. Its face is brownish-gray.

== Range and habitat ==
Sturnira parvidens is found from Sonora in the northwest and Tamaulipas in the northeast along both the eastern and western coastal slopes of central Mexico and throughout the whole of southern Mexico and Central America as far south as northern Costa Rica. Within this range it inhabits a wide variety of forest types, elevations up to 2,000 m (6,600 ft) above sea level. No geographic subspecies are currently recognized.

== Biology and behavior ==
The bat is most commonly found in the sub-canopy or understory of tropical forests, close to water or agricultural land. It is more common in recently formed secondary forests, and thus can serve as a useful indicator of forest disturbance. It roosts in tree cavities or similar spaces, either alone or in small groups that usually number no more than three. It feeds on fruit, primarily from pioneer plants, and is an important seed disperser in some areas.

Females are polyestrous and can give birth to their single young at any time during the year, although there may be two or three peak reproductive periods per year in some localities, depending on the local climate.
