= Sturnira perla =

Conservation status
- Data Deficient (IUCN 3.1)

Scientific classification
- Domain: Eukaryota
- Kingdom: Animalia
- Phylum: Chordata
- Class: Mammalia
- Order: Chiroptera
- Family: Phyllostomidae
- Genus: Sturnira
- Species: S. perla

Binomial name
- Sturnira perla Jarrín & Kunz, 2011

Species of bat

Sturnira perla is a species of yellow-shouldered bat found in Ecuador.

== Taxonomy and etymology ==
It was described as a new species in 2011 by Jarrín and Kunz. The holotype had been collected in Bosque Protector La Perla in 1990. Its species name "perla" was chosen both to refer to something "very precious" as well as the globular shape of its skull. Additionally, the species name honors Bosque Protector La Perla, which is where the majority of the specimens used in the original description were found.

== Description ==
Its forearm length is 42.7–43.5 mm (1.68–1.71 in). It is regarded as a cryptic species, as it is similar in appearance to the little, Louis's, and Tilda's yellow-shouldered bats. Its dental formula is 2.1.2.32.1.2.3 for a total of 32 teeth.

== Range and habitat ==
It is endemic to Ecuador. It is found in lowland habitats of 35–200 m (115–656 ft) above sea level.

== Conservation ==
As of 2016, it is assessed as data deficient by the IUCN because it is poorly known, and, while it could be severely impacted by deforestation, it is also possible that its range could be larger than currently projected.
