= Lesser yellow-shouldered bat =

Conservation status
- Endangered (IUCN 3.1)

Scientific classification
- Kingdom: Animalia
- Phylum: Chordata
- Class: Mammalia
- Order: Chiroptera
- Family: Phyllostomidae
- Genus: Sturnira
- Species: S. nana

Binomial name
- Sturnira nana Gardner & O'Neill, 1971
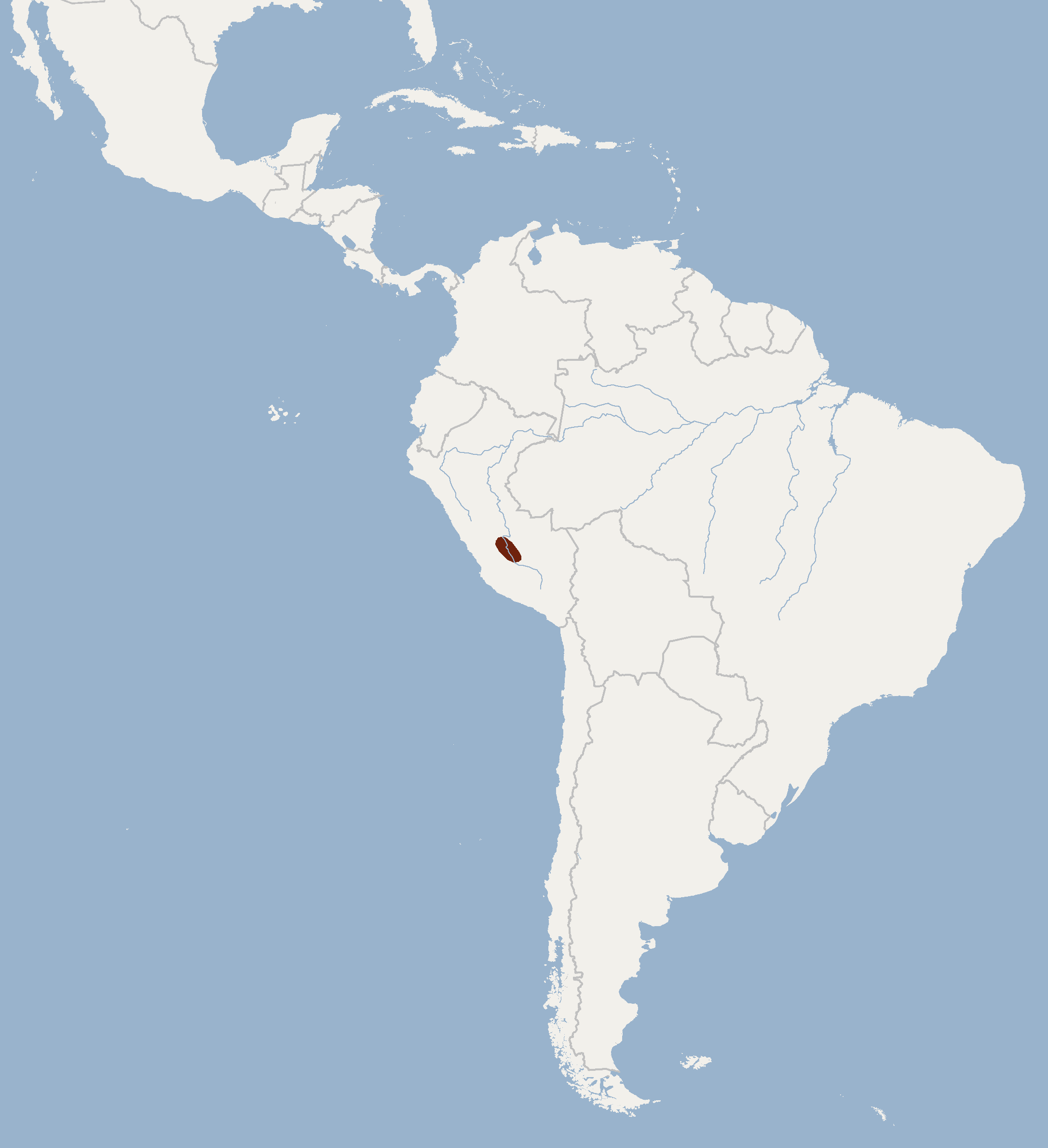

Species of bat

The lesser yellow-shouldered bat (Sturnira nana) is a species of bat in the family Phyllostomidae. It is native to Peru and Ecuador. It is threatened by habitat loss.

== Taxonomy and etymology ==
It was described in 1971, based on a specimen that had been collected in 1970. It is a member of the yellow-shouldered bats. Its lineage is basal to the other members of its genus, with the exception of the bidentate yellow-shouldered bat, Sturnira bidens. The basal Sturnira lineages (S. nana, S. bidens, and S. aratathomasi) began to diverge from other members of the genus during the Late Miocene (5.2–8.1 million years ago). It was initially placed in the subgenus Corvira, though this taxonomic rank is now viewed as synonymous to Sturnira.

Its species name nana is likely derived from Latin word nāna, meaning "dwarf." It is the smallest member of its genus–a fact that is referenced several times in its initial description.

== Description ==
It is the smallest bat in its genus, with its forearm measuring 34.2–35.7 mm (1.35–1.41 in) long. Its tail is approximately 51 mm (2.0 in) long; its hind foot is 10 mm (0.39 in) long; its ear is 13 mm (0.51 in) long. Like the bidentate yellow-shouldered bat, it has a thin or incomplete zygomatic arch. The fur on its back is a dark, grayish brown, while the fur on its ventral side is paler. Individual hairs have four distinct color bands; from base to tip, the colors are white, brown, light silvery brown, and brown again. Ventral hairs lack the final brown terminal color band. The forearm is furred on its dorsal surface. It lacks the shoulder glands found in other members of its genus. Its nose-leaf is long and narrow.

== Range and habitat ==
The type locality of this species is in the Ayacucho Region of Peru. This species was not detected outside of Peru until a 2011 report cited capturing nine individuals in southern Ecuador during April 2009. It has been recorded at elevations of 1,430–1,670 m (4,690–5,480 ft) above sea level. So far, it has only been documented along the eastern edge of the Andean Mountains. Its habitat includes lower elevation montane forests and the edges of clearings.

== Conservation ==
It is currently evaluated as endangered by the IUCN as it is only known from two sites and its distribution is severely fragmented. In 2013, Bat Conservation International listed this species as one of the 35 species of its worldwide priority list of conservation.
