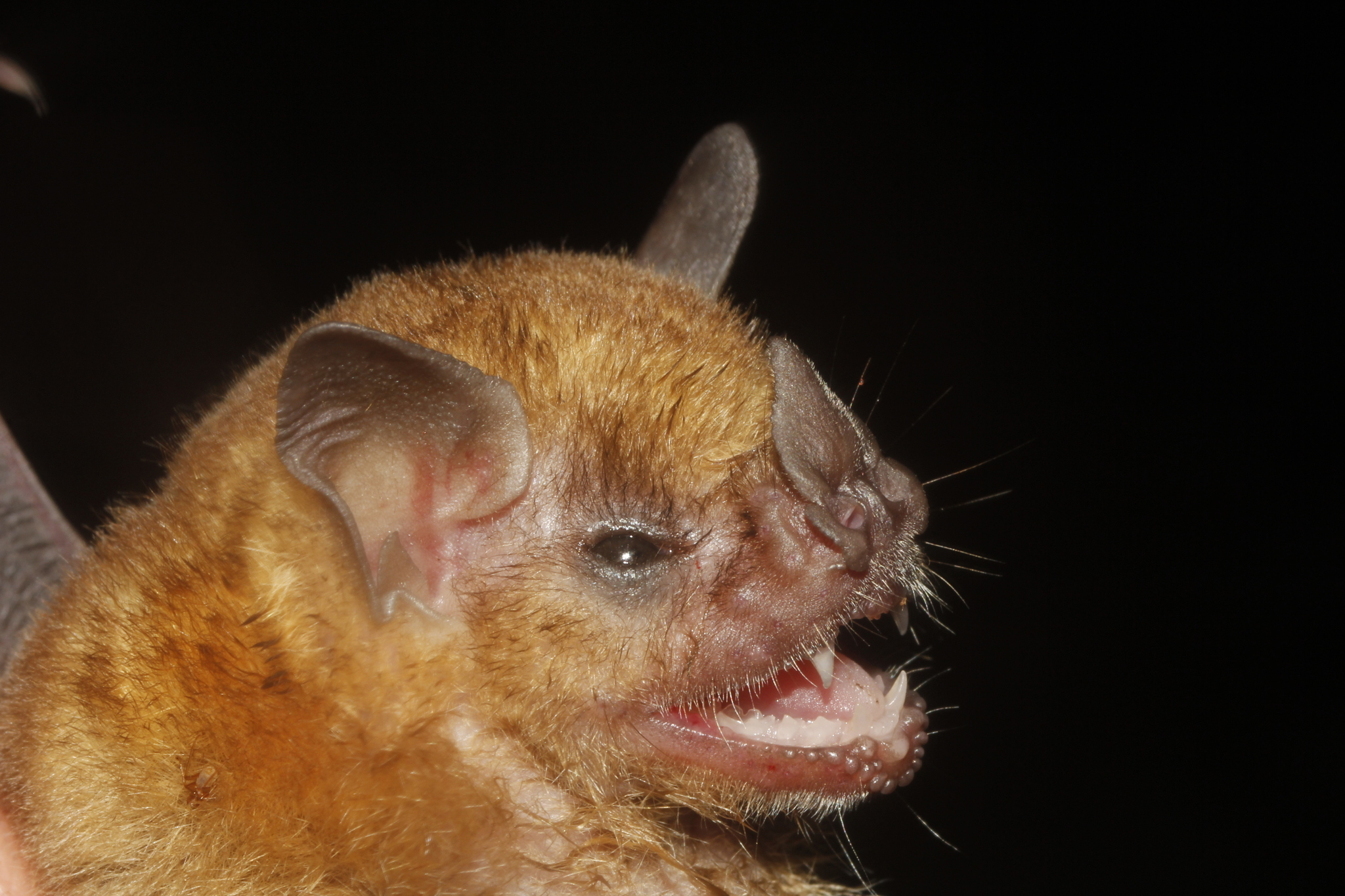

Conservation status
- Least Concern (IUCN 3.1)

Scientific classification
- Kingdom: Animalia
- Phylum: Chordata
- Class: Mammalia
- Order: Chiroptera
- Family: Phyllostomidae
- Genus: Sturnira
- Species: S. hondurensis

Binomial name
- Sturnira hondurensis Goodwin, 1940

Synonyms
- Sturnira ludovici hondurensis Goodwin, 1940

= Sturnira hondurensis =

Species of bat

Sturnira hondurensis is a species of bat found in Central America. Previously, it was considered a subspecies of the highland yellow-shouldered bat, but it has been considered distinct since 2010.

== Taxonomy and etymology ==
It was described as a new species in 1940 by George G. Goodwin. Since its discovery, it has sometimes been considered a subspecies of the highland yellow-shouldered bat, Sturnira ludovici. However, a 2010 study showed that while it is closely related to the highland yellow-shouldered bat, it is distinct enough to be considered its own species. Its species name "hondurensis" is Latin for "belonging to Honduras." Goodwin likely chose hondurensis because the holotype for the species was collected near San José, Honduras.

== Description ==
Its tragi are long and sickle-shaped.

== Biology and ecology ==
It is nocturnal, foraging for food at night and sleeping during the day. In the day, it roosts in sheltered places such as trees. Tree species used for roosting include the American sweetgum, Quercus sartorii, Jamaican nettletree, and the elephant-ear tree. It is frugivorous. It mostly feeds on fruits from the family Solanaceae.

== Conservation ==
It is currently evaluated as least concern by the IUCN.
