= Sturnira paulsoni =

Conservation status
- Near Threatened (IUCN 3.1)

Scientific classification
- Kingdom: Animalia
- Phylum: Chordata
- Class: Mammalia
- Order: Chiroptera
- Family: Phyllostomidae
- Genus: Sturnira
- Species: S. paulsoni

Binomial name
- Sturnira paulsoni de la Torre and Schwartz, 1966

Species of bat

Paulson's yellow-shouldered bat (Sturnira paulsoni) is a species of bat in the family Phyllostomidae. It is endemic to the Lesser Antilles. According to the most recent IUCN analysis in 2019, it is near-threatened.

== Taxonomy ==
The species was originally described as a species by de la Torre and Schwartz in 1966, before being reduced to a subspecies of S. lilium by Jones & Phillips in 1976. It was restored species status in 2013.

== Habitat and distribution ==
The species is found on the islands of Saint Vincent, Grenada and Saint Lucia in the Lesser Antilles. The bat mainly inhabit native humid tropical forests.

== Biology ==
It is frugivorous. A study of echolocation calls of this species found that the species is adapted to fly in highly cluttered spaces, but can also fly fast and efficiently in open areas.

== Conservation ==
The species is listed as near-threatened by the IUCN. The main threats it faces, like most other island species, is the chance of natural disasters like hurricanes and volcanic eruptions. It is also threatened by the change in land use and agriculture.
