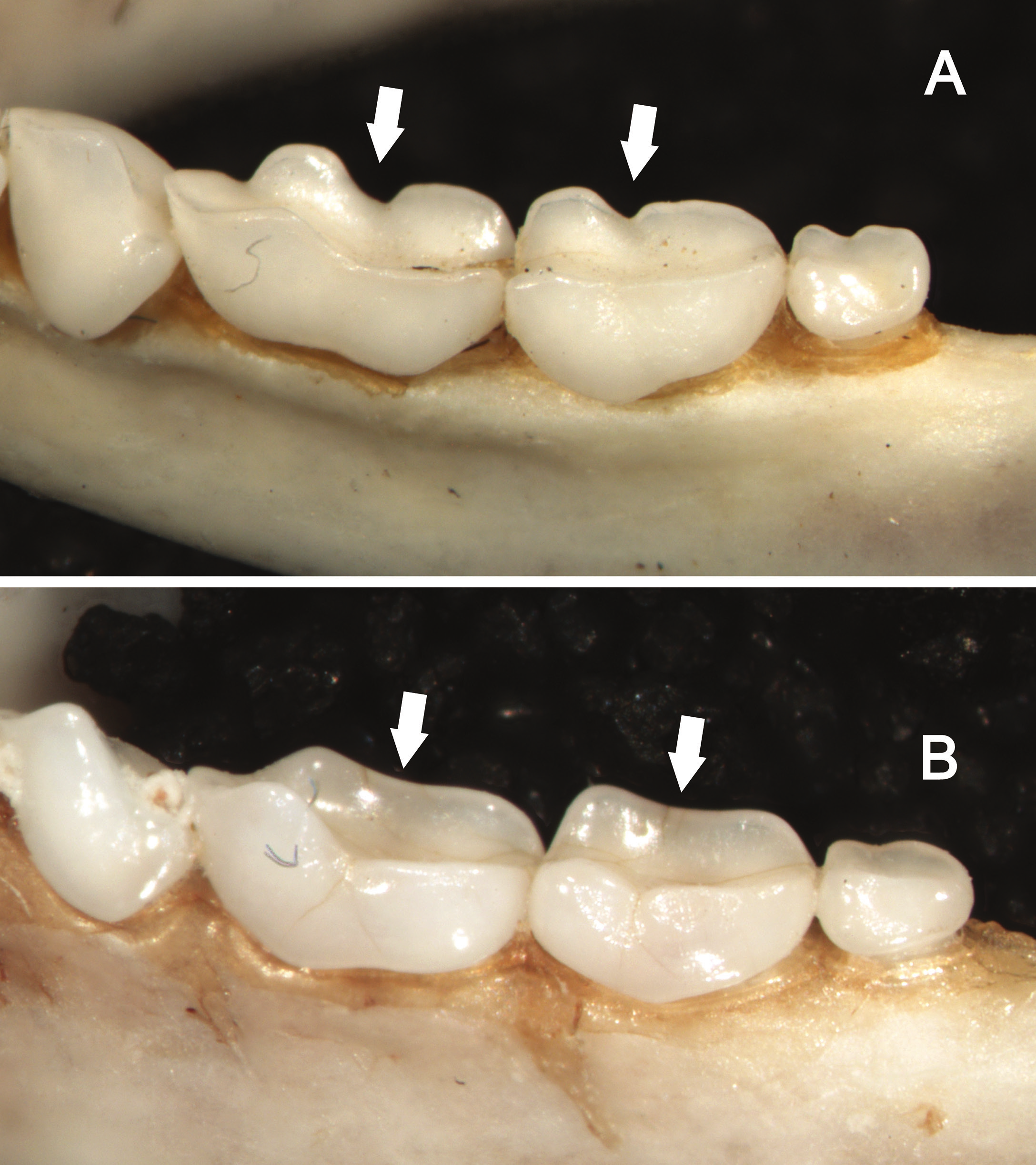

Conservation status
- Least Concern (IUCN 3.1)

Scientific classification
- Kingdom: Animalia
- Phylum: Chordata
- Class: Mammalia
- Order: Chiroptera
- Family: Phyllostomidae
- Genus: Sturnira
- Species: S. bakeri

Binomial name
- Sturnira bakeri Velazco & Patterson, 2014

= Sturnira bakeri =

Species of mammal

Sturnira bakeri is a species of bat found in South-America.

== Taxonomy ==
Sturnira bakeri was described as a new species in 2014. Its description was the result of molecular and morphological new analyses. The holotype had been collected in El Oro, which is in western Ecuador. The eponym for the species name "bakeri" is the scientist Robert James Baker, for his significant contribution "to the evolution of Neotropical phyllostomids".

== Range and habitat ==
So far, this species was recorded in three countries of South-America : Ecuador, Peru and Colombia.

== Literature cited ==
- Montoya-Bustamante, S., Zapata-Mesa, N., González-Chávez, B., & Obando-Cabrera, L. 2017. First records of Sturnira bakeri Velazco & Patterson, 2014 (Chiroptera: Phyllostomidae) from Colombia. Check List, 13, 1.
- Sánchez, P., & Pacheco, V. 2016. New record of Sturnira bakeri Velazco & Patterson, 2014 (Chiroptera: Phyllostomidae) from northwestern Peru. Check List, 12(5), 1984.
- Velazco, P. M., & Patterson, B. D. 2014. Two new species of yellow-shouldered bats, genus Sturnira Gray, 1842 (Chiroptera, Phyllostomidae) from Costa Rica, Panama and western Ecuador. ZooKeys, (402), 43.
