= Tschudi's yellow-shouldered bat =

Conservation status
- Least Concern (IUCN 3.1)

Scientific classification
- Kingdom: Animalia
- Phylum: Chordata
- Class: Mammalia
- Order: Chiroptera
- Family: Phyllostomidae
- Genus: Sturnira
- Species: S. oporaphilum

Binomial name
- Sturnira oporaphilum (Tschudi, 1844)
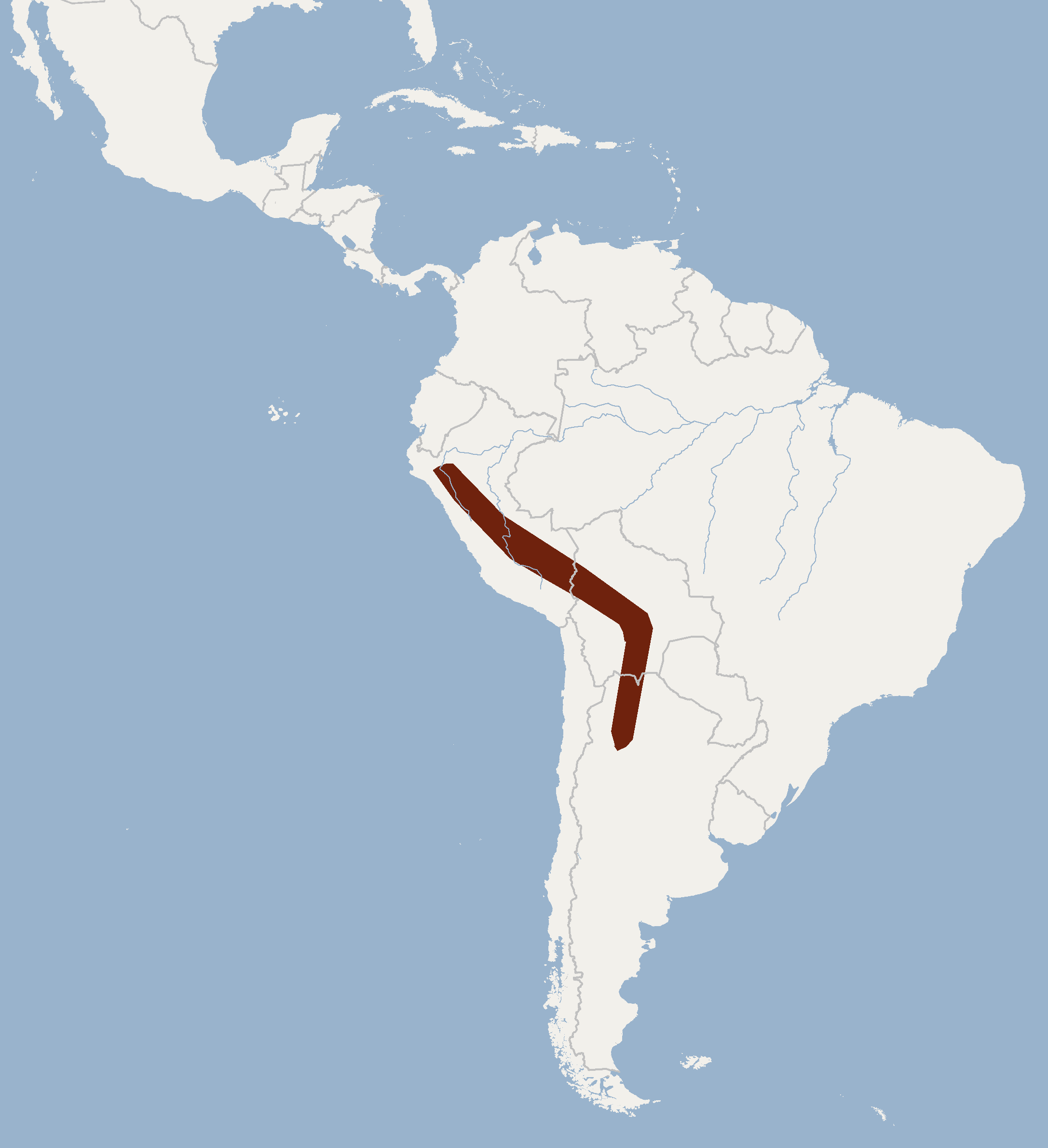

Species of bat

Tschudi's yellow-shouldered bat (Sturnira oporaphilum) is a species of leaf-nosed bat indigenous to Argentina, Ecuador, and Peru, with its range also encompassing Bolivia.
