= Greater yellow-shouldered bat =

Conservation status
- Least Concern (IUCN 3.1)

Scientific classification
- Kingdom: Animalia
- Phylum: Chordata
- Class: Mammalia
- Order: Chiroptera
- Family: Phyllostomidae
- Genus: Sturnira
- Species: S. magna

Binomial name
- Sturnira magna de la Torre, 1966
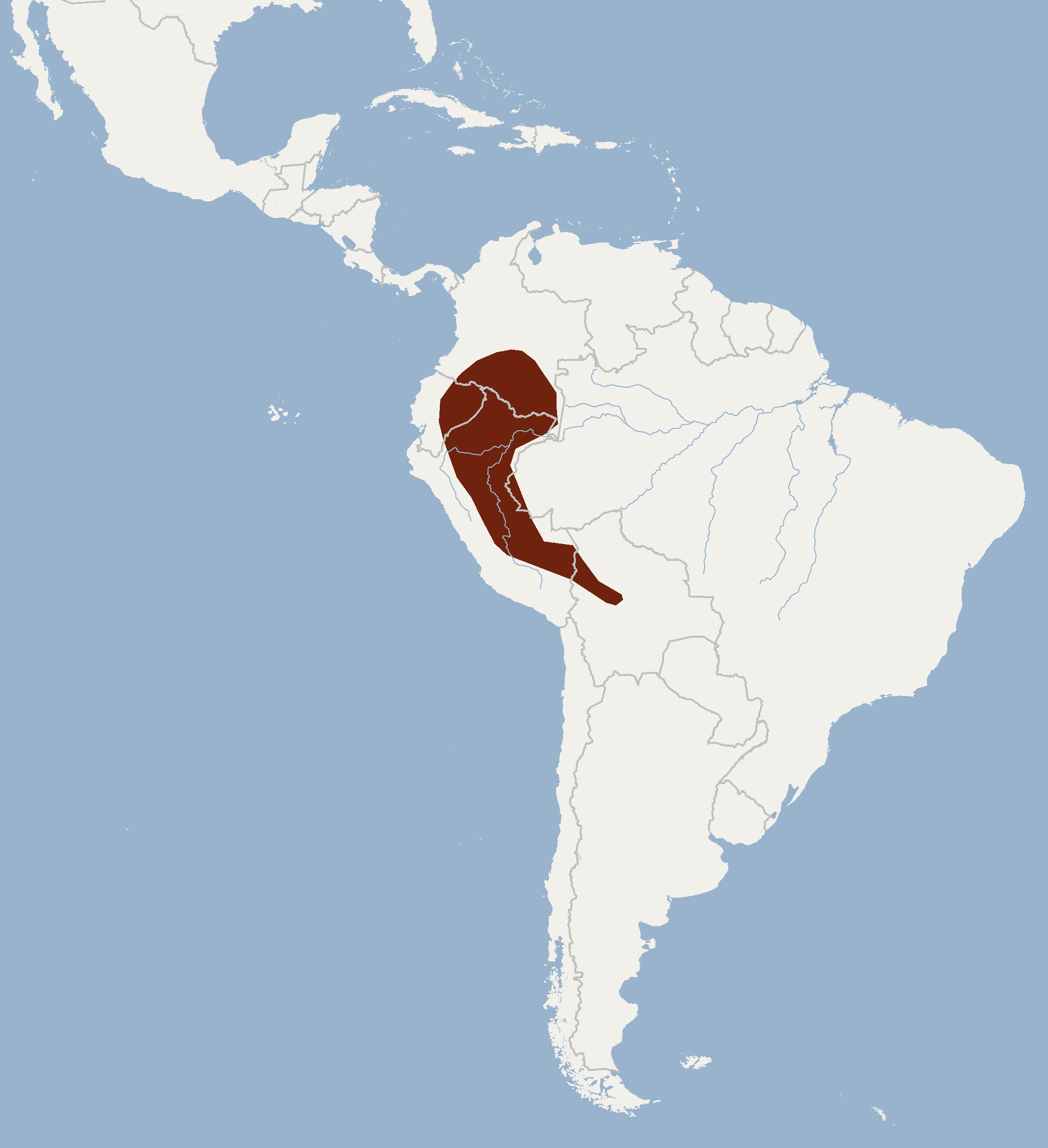

Species of bat

The greater yellow-shouldered bat (Sturnira magna) is a species of bat in the family Phyllostomidae. It is found in Bolivia, Colombia, Ecuador, and Peru.
