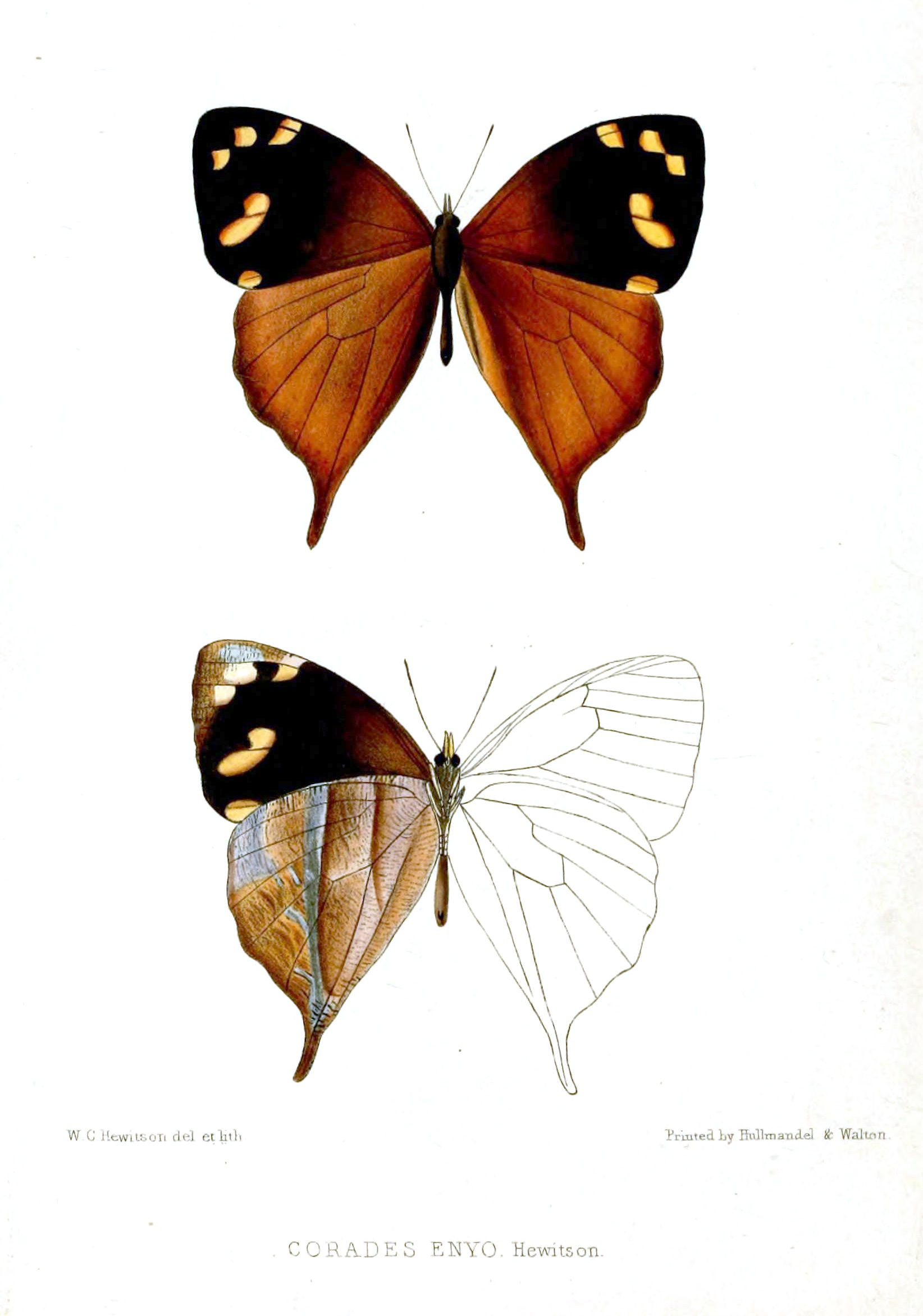

Scientific classification
- Kingdom: Animalia
- Phylum: Arthropoda
- Clade: Pancrustacea
- Class: Insecta
- Order: Lepidoptera
- Family: Nymphalidae
- Genus: Corades
- Species: C. enyo

Binomial name
- Corades enyo Hewitson, 1849

Synonyms
- Corades auriga Herrich-Schäffer, [1856]

= Corades enyo =

Species of butterfly

Corades enyo, the Enyo satyr, is a species of butterfly found in the high elevations of the Andes in Colombia and Peru. It is found in the cloud forests at altitudes of 2,200–3,000 metres (7,200–9,800 ft). They belong to subtribe Pronophilina of the subfamily Satyrinae. The caterpillars grow on Chusquea species of bamboo.

== Subspecies ==
- Corades enyo enyo (northern Venezuela)
- Corades enyo almo Thieme, 1907 (Bolivia, Peru, Colombia, Venezuela, Ecuador)
