= Bidentate yellow-shouldered bat =

Conservation status
- Least Concern (IUCN 3.1)

Scientific classification
- Kingdom: Animalia
- Phylum: Chordata
- Class: Mammalia
- Order: Chiroptera
- Family: Phyllostomidae
- Genus: Sturnira
- Species: S. bidens

Binomial name
- Sturnira bidens (Thomas, 1915)
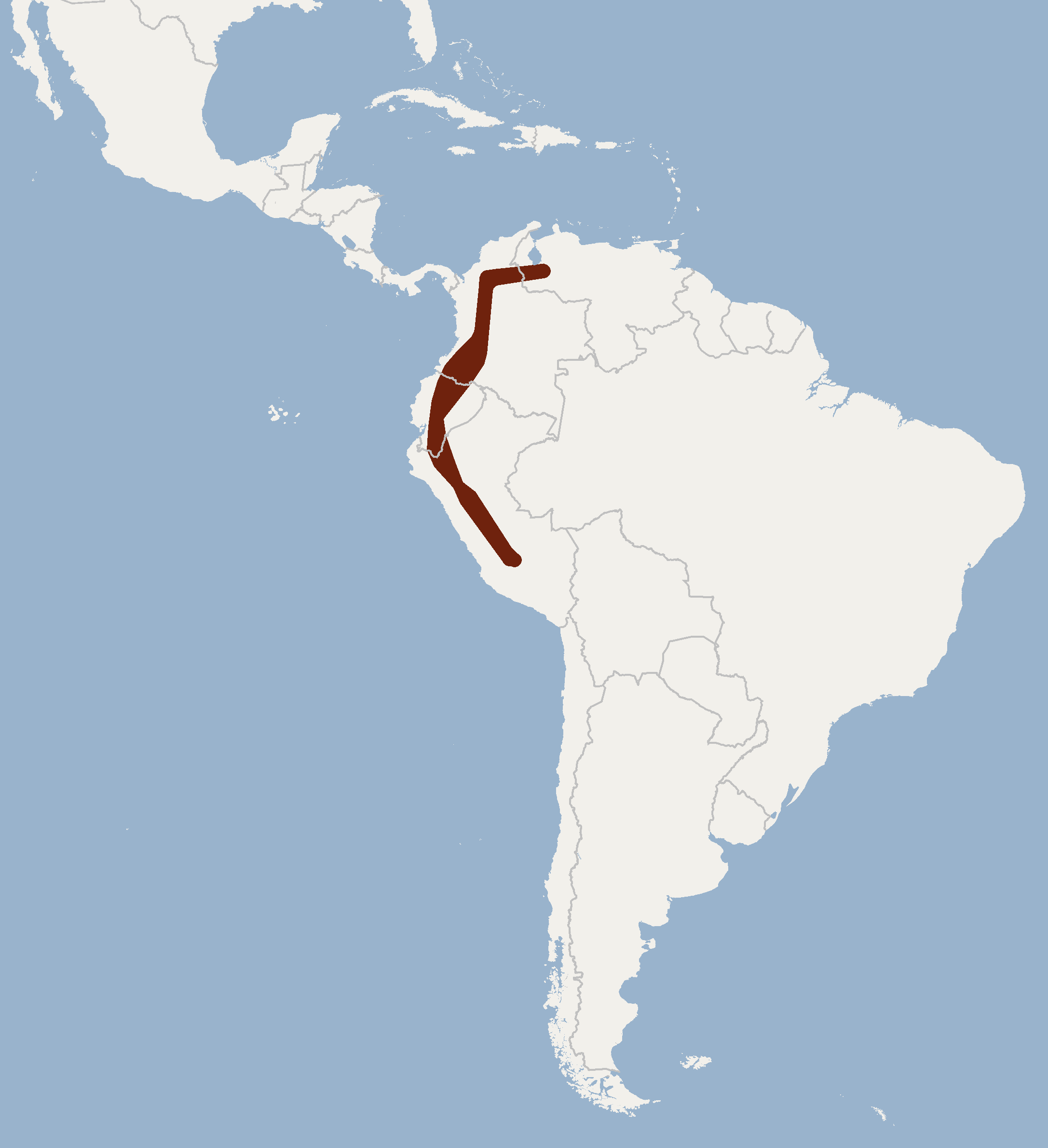

Synonyms
- Corvira bidens Thomas, 1915

Species of bat

The bidentate yellow-shouldered bat (Sturnira bidens) is a species of bat in the family Phyllostomidae. It is found in South America.

== Taxonomy and etymology ==
It was described as a new species in 1915 by British zoologist Oldfield Thomas. The holotype had been collected by Walter Goodfellow in April 1914 in Baeza, Ecuador. Thomas described a new, now-defunct genus, Corvira, giving the species the binomial of Corvira bidens. The species name "bidens" is Latin for "two teeth;" of the bidentate yellow bat, Thomas wrote, "lower incisors only two."

== Description ==
It has a forearm length of 39.3–43.3 mm (1.55–1.70 in). It has a long and narrow snout and an overall narrow skull. It has a dental formula of 2.1.2.31.1.2.3 for a total of 30 teeth.

== Range and habitat ==
Its range includes Peru, Ecuador, Colombia, and Venezuela. It is found in association with the Andes Mountains at elevations of 1,700–3,000 m (5,600–9,800 ft).

As of 2018, it was evaluated as a least-concern species by the IUCN, which is its lowest conservation priority.
