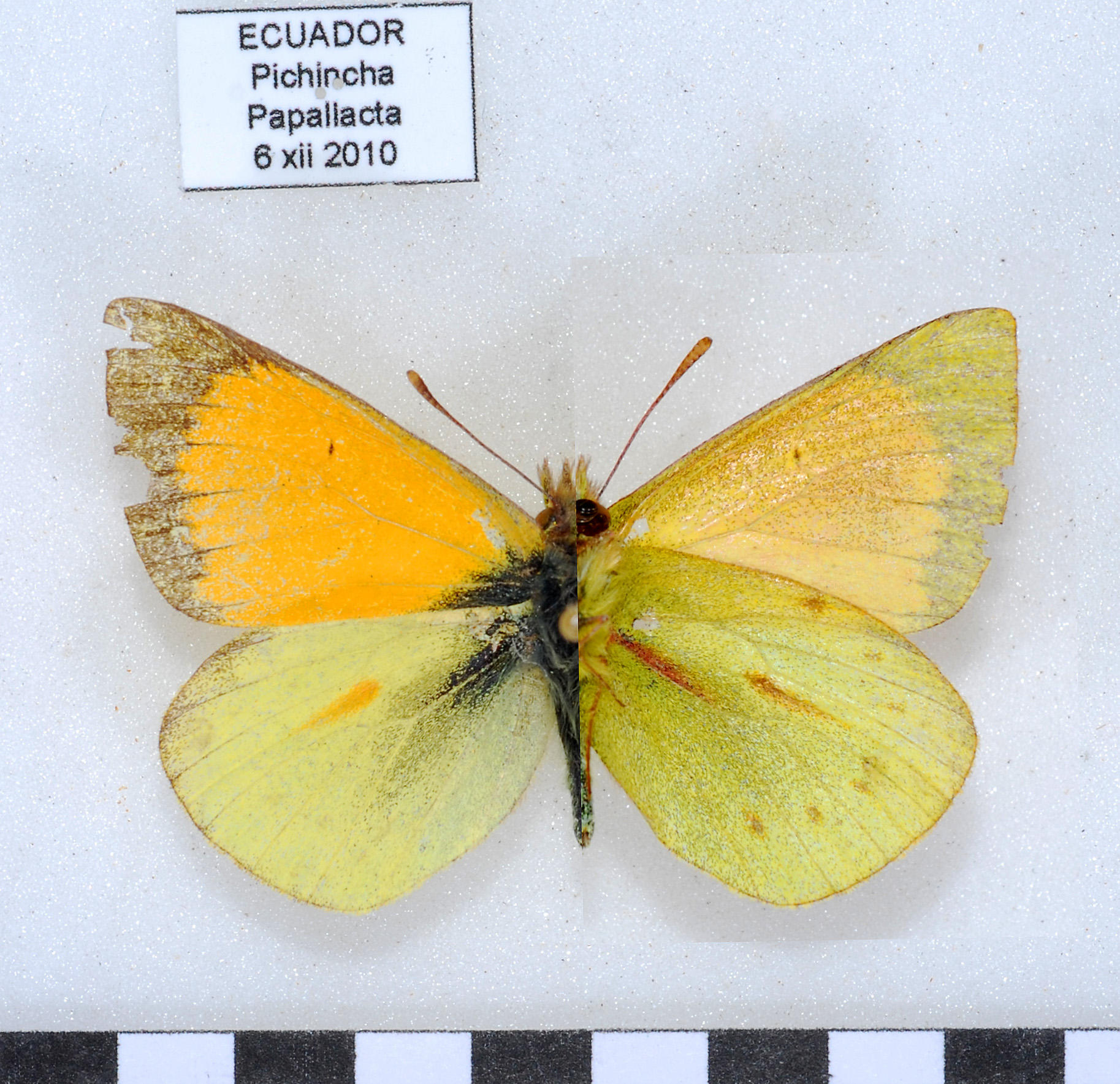
- Dorsal surface (left) and ventral surface (right) of adult male

Scientific classification
- Kingdom: Animalia
- Phylum: Arthropoda
- Clade: Pancrustacea
- Class: Insecta
- Order: Lepidoptera
- Family: Pieridae
- Genus: Colias
- Species: C. dimera

Binomial name
- Colias dimera Doubleday, 1847

Synonyms
- C. erythrogrammus Kollar, 1850; C. erythrogramma Kollar, 1850; C. dimera ab. semperi Strecker, 1873; C. dimera ab. meridensis Neuburger, 1905; C. dimera mariae Apolinar, 1914; C. dimera var. fassli Apolinar, 1914; C. tolima Fassl, 1915; C. dimera f. andromorpha Fernández, 1928; C. dimera f. superba Berger, 1937; C. dimera f. alba Berger, 1937; C. minuscula f. peruviensis Dufrane, 1947

= Colias dimera =

Dimera sulphur

Species of butterfly

Colias dimera, the Dimera sulphur, is a butterfly in the family Pieridae. It is found in the Tropical Andes subregion of the Neotropical realm (Venezuela, Colombia, Peru, and Ecuador). The species was first discovered in Colombia. It is the most abundant butterfly in the interior of Ecuador.

The wingspan is 35–40 mm (1.4–1.6 in).
