= Louis's yellow-shouldered bat =

Conservation status
- Least Concern (IUCN 3.1)

Scientific classification
- Kingdom: Animalia
- Phylum: Chordata
- Class: Mammalia
- Order: Chiroptera
- Family: Phyllostomidae
- Genus: Sturnira
- Species: S. luisi

Binomial name
- Sturnira luisi Davis, 1980
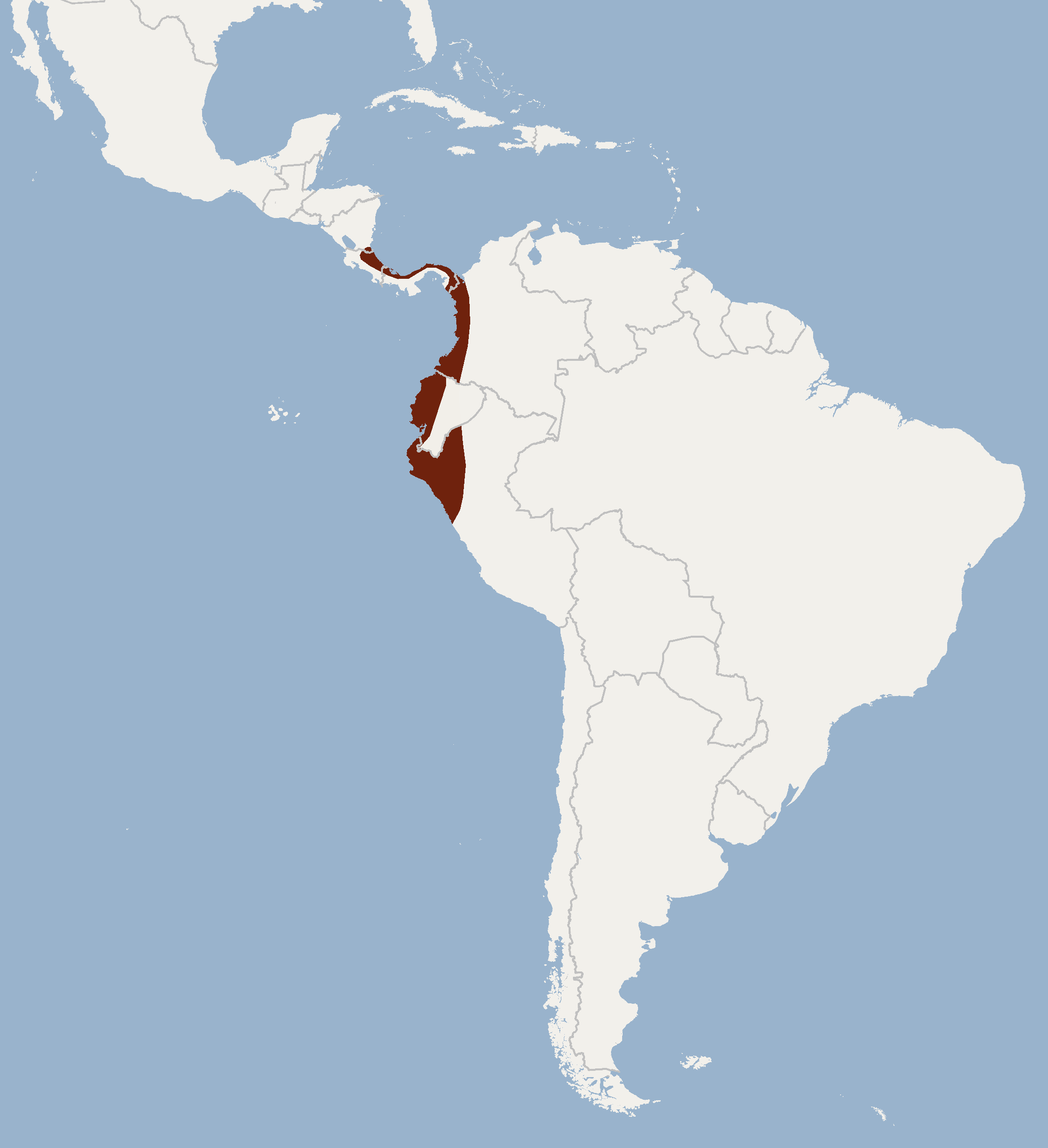

Species of bat

Louis's yellow-shouldered bat (Sturnira luisi) is a species of bat in the family Phyllostomidae. It is found in Colombia, Costa Rica, Ecuador, Panama, and Peru.
