= Sturnira koopmanhilli =

Conservation status
- Data Deficient (IUCN 3.1)

Scientific classification
- Domain: Eukaryota
- Kingdom: Animalia
- Phylum: Chordata
- Class: Mammalia
- Order: Chiroptera
- Family: Phyllostomidae
- Genus: Sturnira
- Species: S. koopmanhilli

Binomial name
- Sturnira koopmanhilli McCarthy, Albuja, & Alberico, 2006
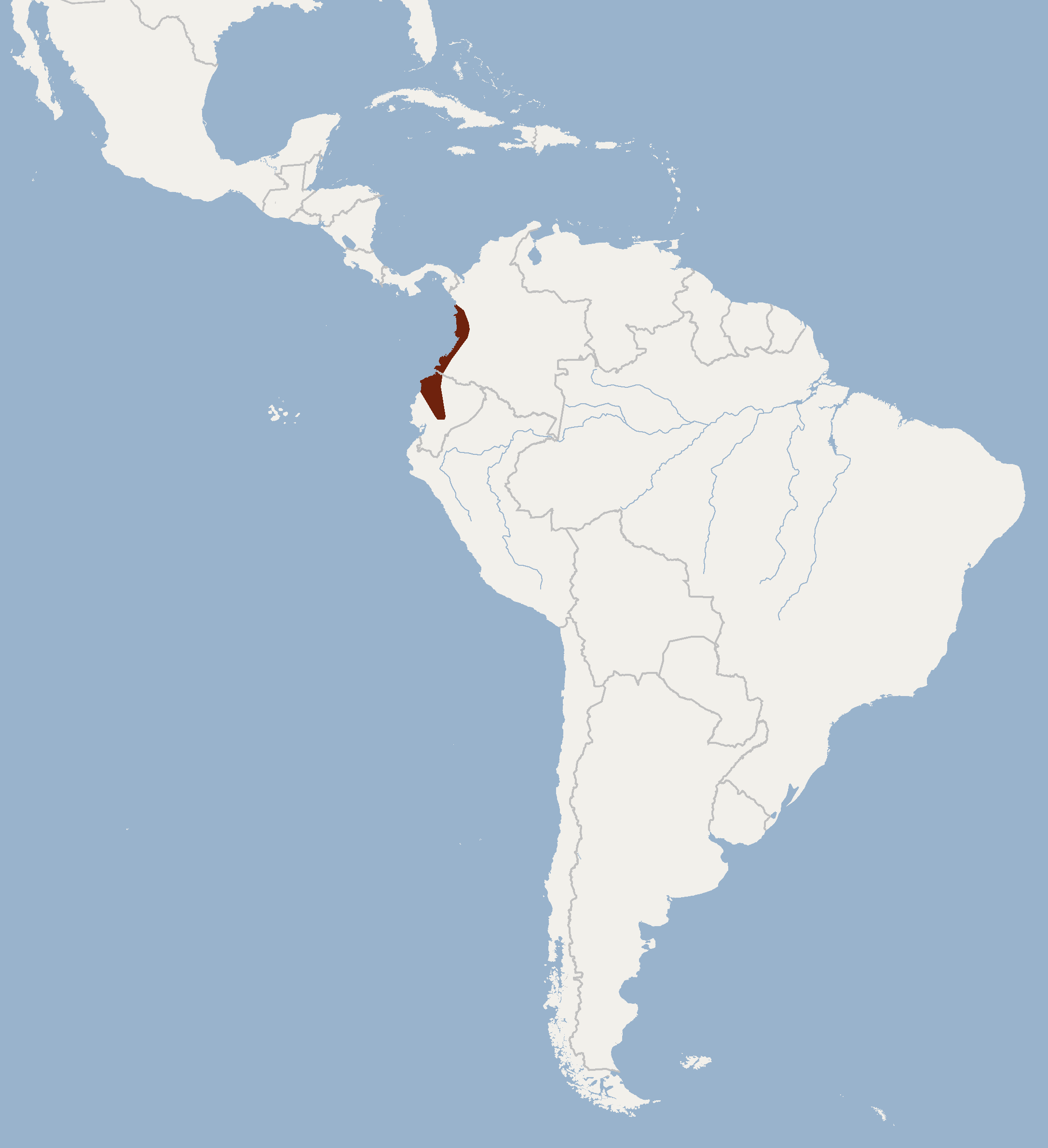

Species of bat

Sturnira koopmanhilli is a species of leaf-nosed bat found in South America.

== Taxonomy ==
It was described as a new species in 2006. The holotype had been collected in 1991 in Cotacachi Cayapas Ecological Reserve—a nature reserve in Ecuador. The eponyms for its species name "koopmanhilli" are American zoologist Karl Koopman (1920 – 1997) and British mammalogist John Edwards Hill (1928 – 1997).

== Description ==
Males have a forearm length of 49.2–52.4 mm (1.94–2.06 in), while females have a forearm length of 48.1–52.2 mm (1.89–2.06 in). Additionally, males weigh 30.0 g (1.06 oz), while females weigh 25.5–31.5 g (0.90–1.11 oz). It has a dental formula of 2.1.2.32.1.2.3 for a total of 32 teeth.

== Range and status ==
S. koopmanhilli has been documented in Ecuador and Colombia. It has been documented at a range of altitudes, from 300–2,000 m (980–6,560 ft) above sea level. The extent of its geographic range is also poorly understood, as are any threats that it may be facing. As of 2016, it was evaluated as a data deficient species by the IUCN because basic details of its biology and ecology are not yet known. It is possibly impacted by the deforestation of the Tumbes-Chocó-Magdalena region.
