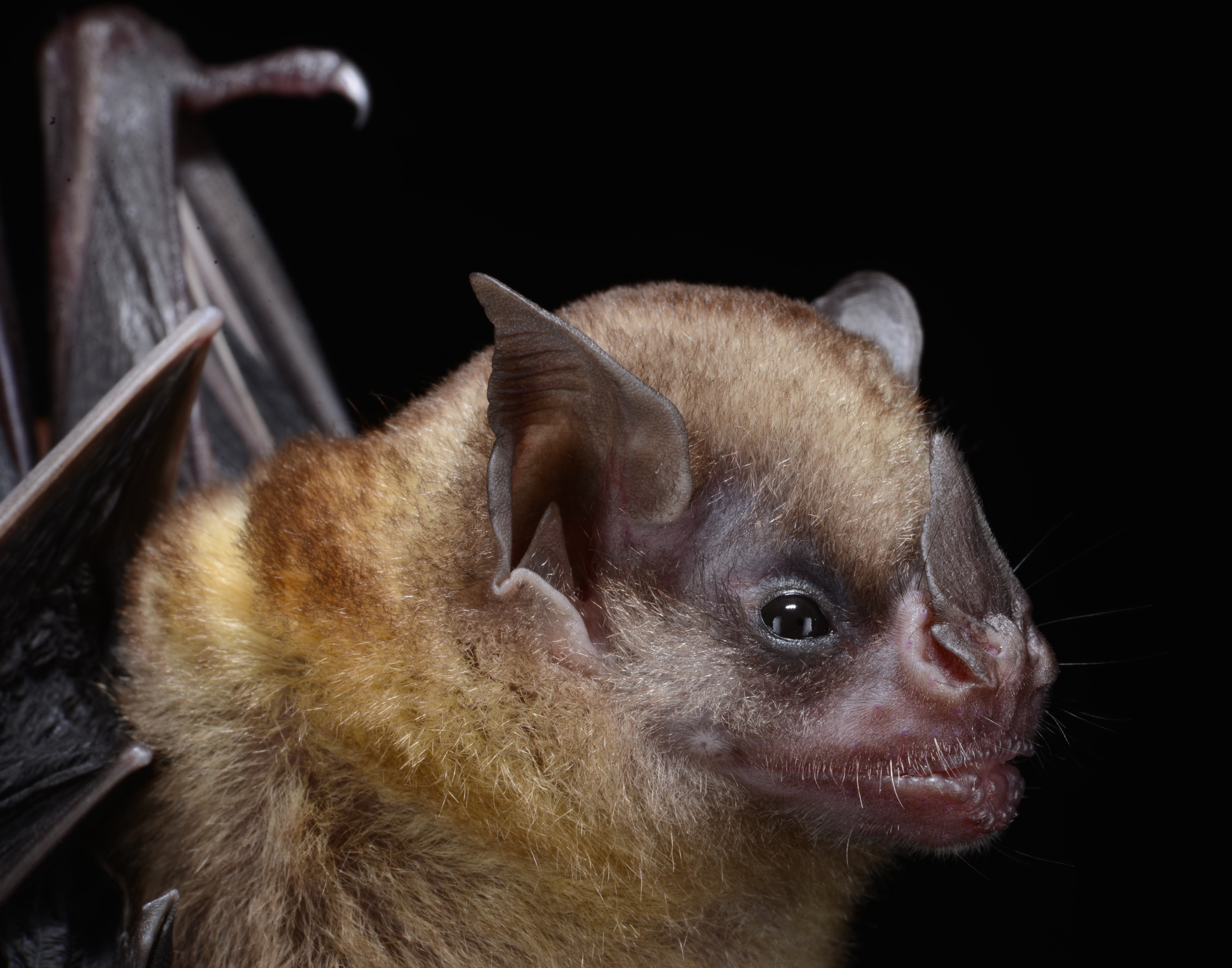
- Tilda's yellow-shouldered bat (Sturnira tildae)

Scientific classification
- Kingdom: Animalia
- Phylum: Chordata
- Class: Mammalia
- Order: Chiroptera
- Family: Phyllostomidae
- Subfamily: Stenodermatinae
- Genus: Sturnira; Gray, 1842

Type species
- Sturnira spectrum Gray, 1842

Species
- See text

= Sturnira =

Genus of bats

Sturnira known as a yellow-shouldered bat or American epauleted bat, is a genus of bat in the family Phyllostomidae. The genus name comes from the Latin for "starling" and refers to HMS Starling, which took part in an 1836 voyage to Brazil during which the type specimen was collected. It contains the following species:

- Angel's yellow-shouldered bat, Sturnira angeli
- Aratathomas's yellow-shouldered bat, Sturnira aratathomasi
- Baker's yellow-shouldered bat, Sturnira bakeri
- Bidentate yellow-shouldered bat, Sturnira bidens
- Bogotá yellow-shouldered bat, Sturnira bogotensis
- Burton's yellow-shouldered bat, Sturnira burtonlimi
- Hairy yellow-shouldered bat, Sturnira erythromos
- Gianna's yellow-shouldered bat, Sturnira giannae
- Choco yellow-shouldered bat, Sturnira hondurensis
- Sturnira koopmanhilli
- Little yellow-shouldered bat, Sturnira lilium
- Highland yellow-shouldered bat, Sturnira ludovici
- Louis's yellow-shouldered bat, Sturnira luisi
- Greater yellow-shouldered bat, Sturnira magna
- Mistratoan yellow-shouldered bat, Sturnira mistratensis
- Talamancan yellow-shouldered bat, Sturnira mordax
- Lesser yellow-shouldered bat, Sturnira nana
- Tschudi's yellow-shouldered bat, Sturnira oporaphilum
- Northern yellow-shouldered bat, Sturnira parvidens
- Paulson's yellow-shouldered bat, Sturnira paulsoni
- La Perla yellow-shouldered bat, Sturnira perla
- Soriano's yellow-shouldered bat, Sturnira sorianoi
- Tilda's yellow-shouldered bat, Sturnira tildae
