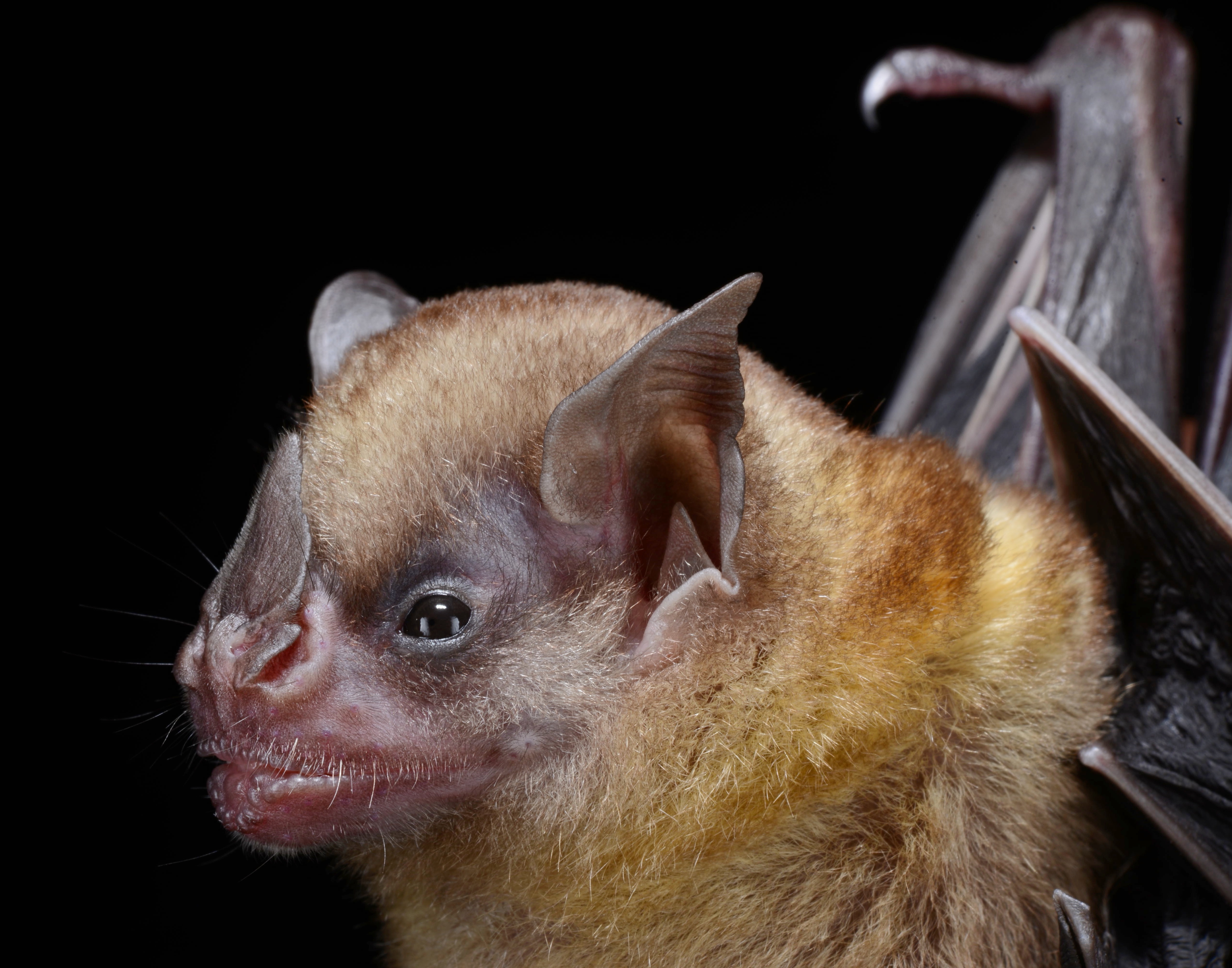

Conservation status
- Least Concern (IUCN 3.1)

Scientific classification
- Kingdom: Animalia
- Phylum: Chordata
- Class: Mammalia
- Order: Chiroptera
- Family: Phyllostomidae
- Genus: Sturnira
- Species: S. tildae

Binomial name
- Sturnira tildae de la Torre, 1959
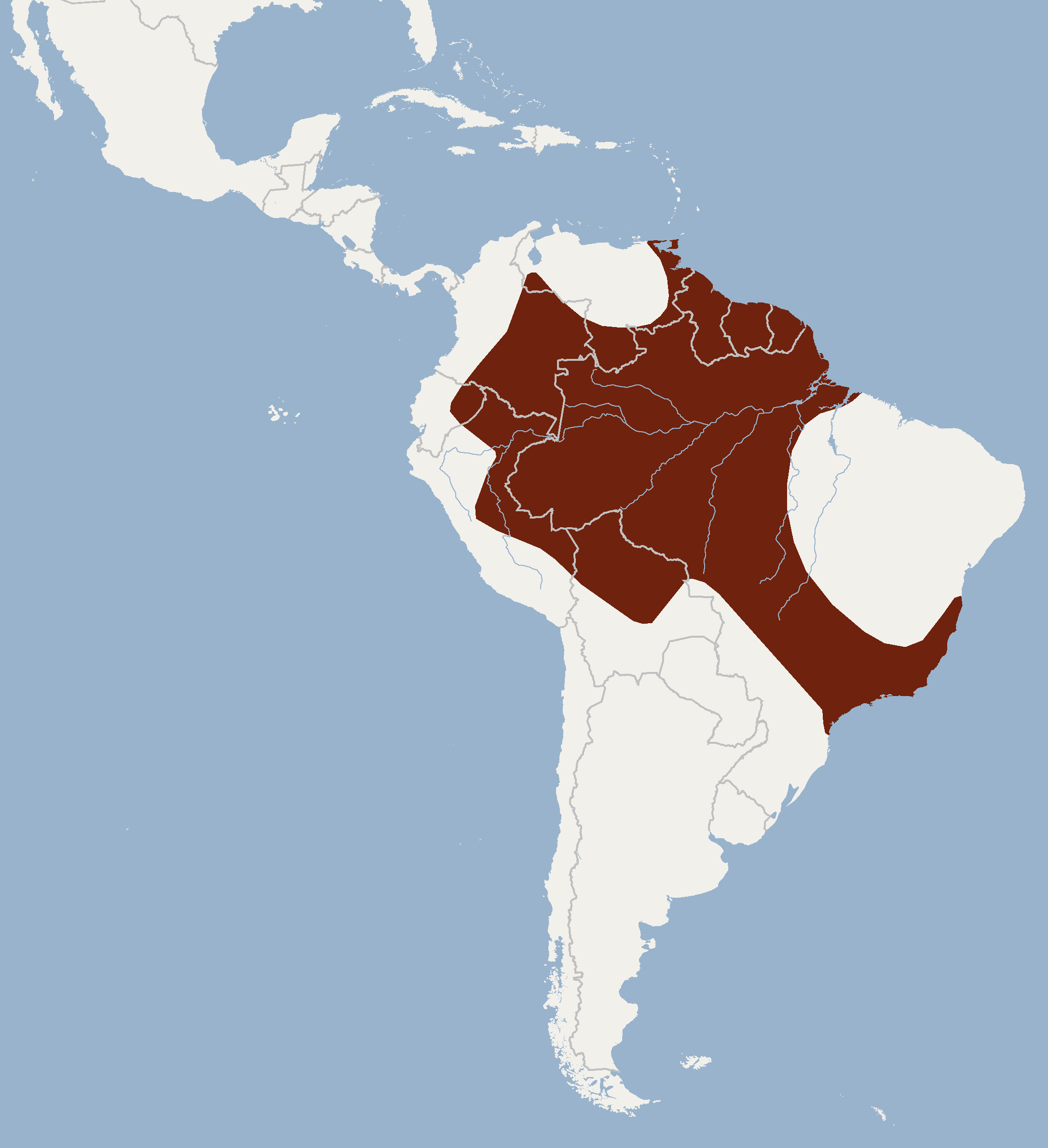

= Tilda's yellow-shouldered bat =

Species of bat

Tilda's yellow-shouldered bat (Sturnira tildae) is a bat species, found in Bolivia, Brazil, Colombia, Ecuador, French Guiana, Guyana, Peru, Suriname, Venezuela, and Trinidad and Tobago.
