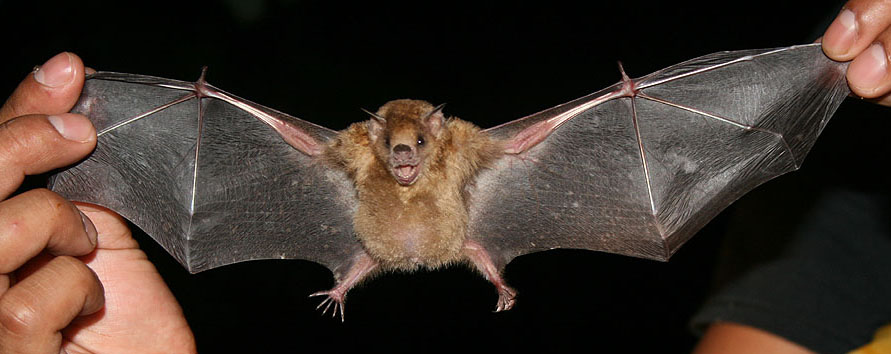

Conservation status
- Least Concern (IUCN 3.1)

Scientific classification
- Kingdom: Animalia
- Phylum: Chordata
- Class: Mammalia
- Order: Chiroptera
- Family: Phyllostomidae
- Genus: Sturnira
- Species: S. lilium

Binomial name
- Sturnira lilium Geoffroy, 1810

= Little yellow-shouldered bat =

Species of bat

The little yellow-shouldered bat (Sturnira lilium) is a bat species from South and Central America. It is a frugivore and an effective seed disperser.

It roosts alone in tree cavities, on branches, vines, and under palm leaves, usually keeping to the same roosts day to day. There is evidence to suggest hypothermia is a thermoregulatory strategy to help adjust metabolic levels. Ambient temperature has been noted as a greater influence on mating than food availability. Its wing shape can also be affected by pregnancy in order to make flight more efficient.

== Gallery ==
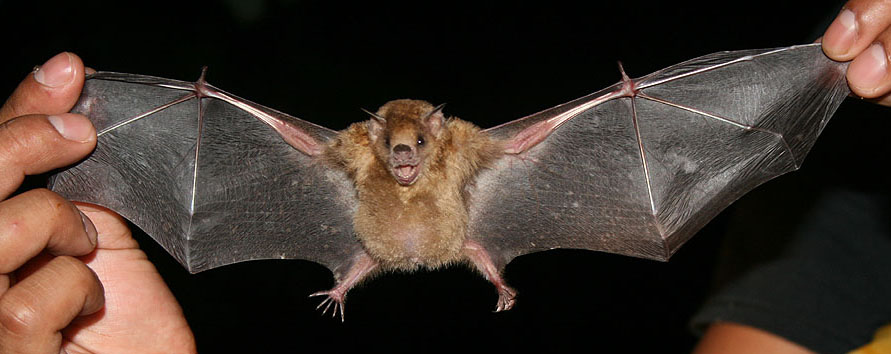
Little yellow-shouldered bat Wingspan

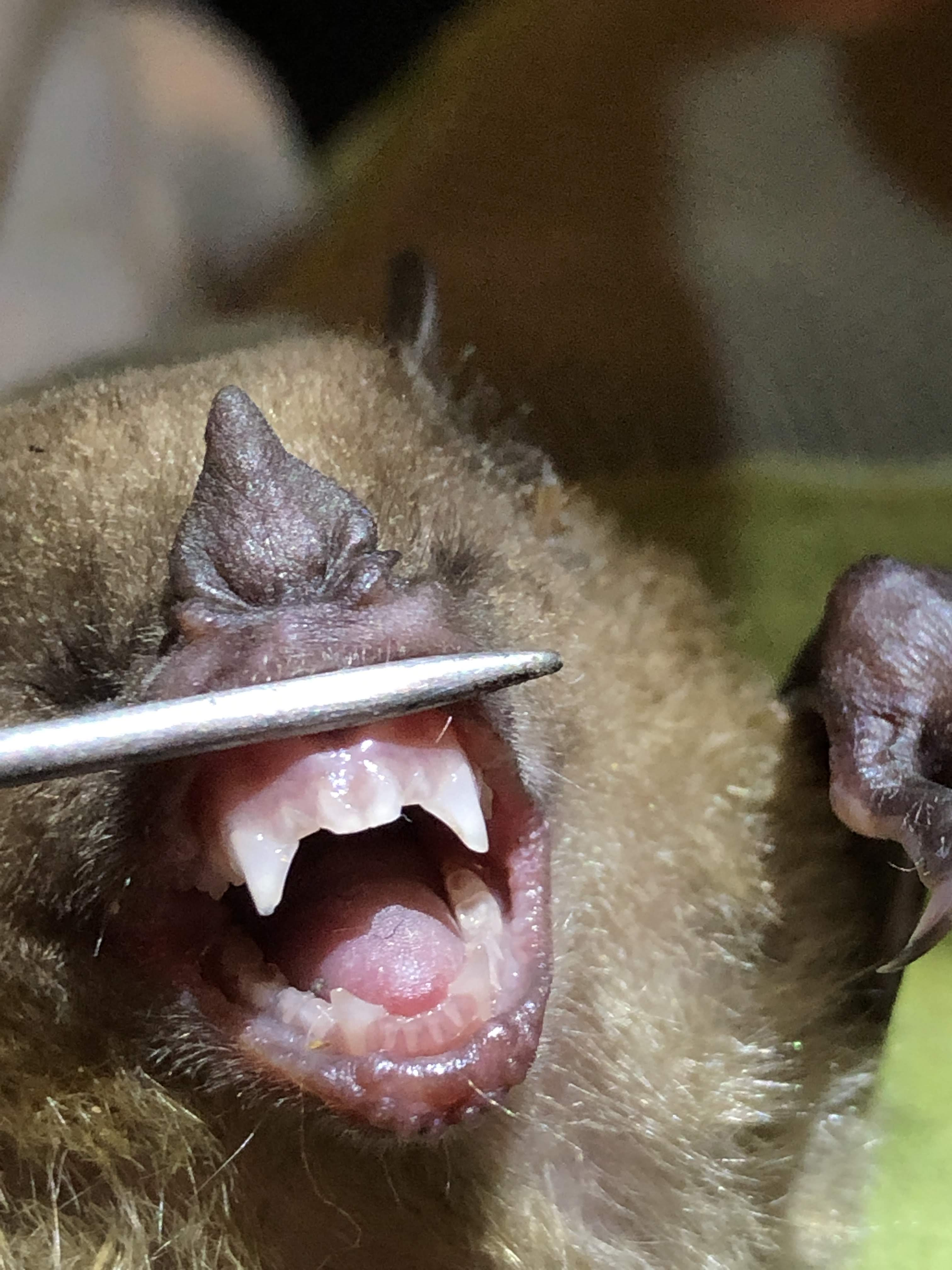
Little yellow-shouldered bat teeth (mature female)

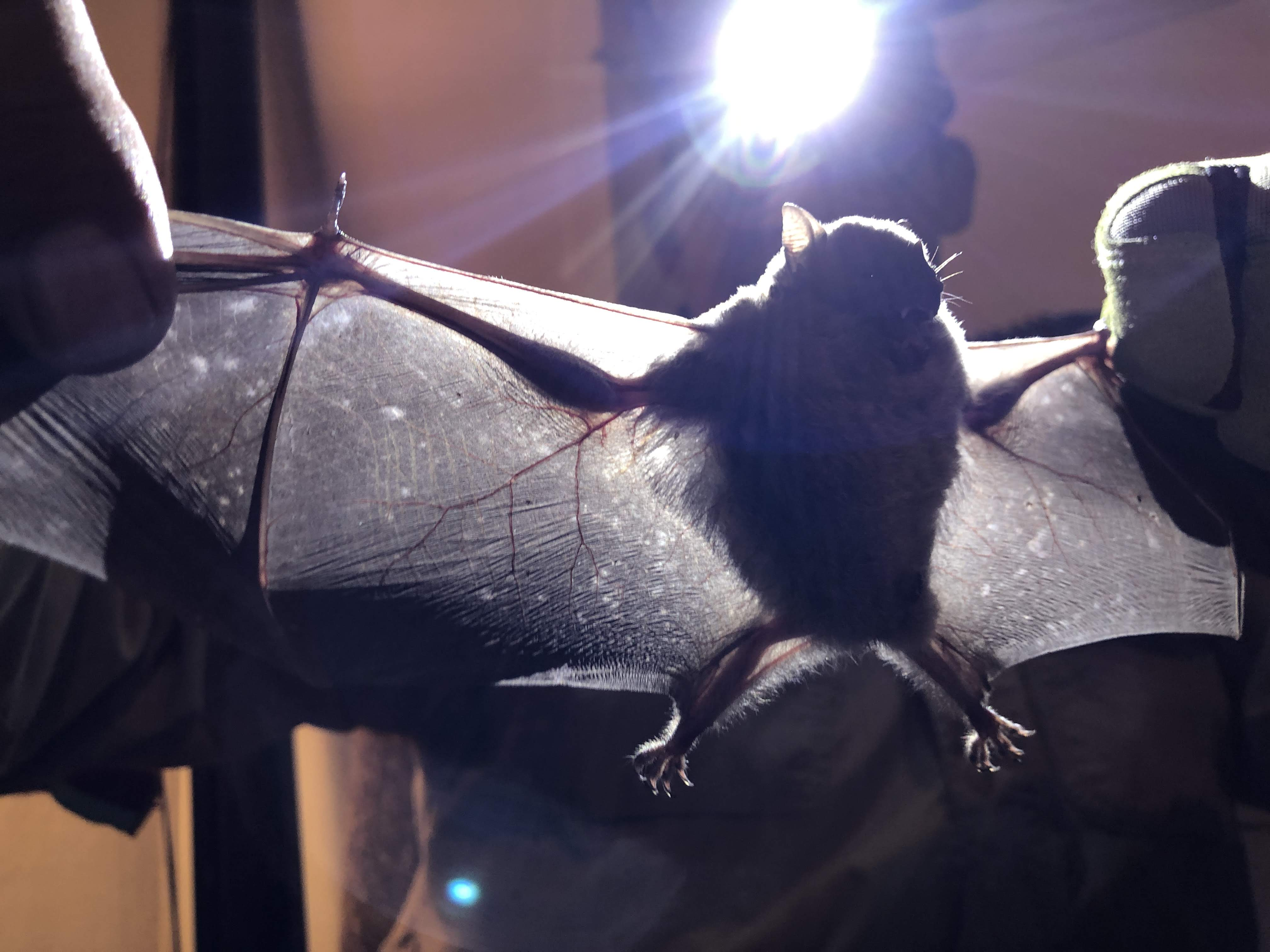
Little yellow-shouldered bat wingspan (transparent) (mature female)
