= Highland yellow-shouldered bat =

Conservation status
- Least Concern (IUCN 3.1)

Scientific classification
- Kingdom: Animalia
- Phylum: Chordata
- Class: Mammalia
- Order: Chiroptera
- Family: Phyllostomidae
- Genus: Sturnira
- Species: S. ludovici

Binomial name
- Sturnira ludovici Anthony, 1924
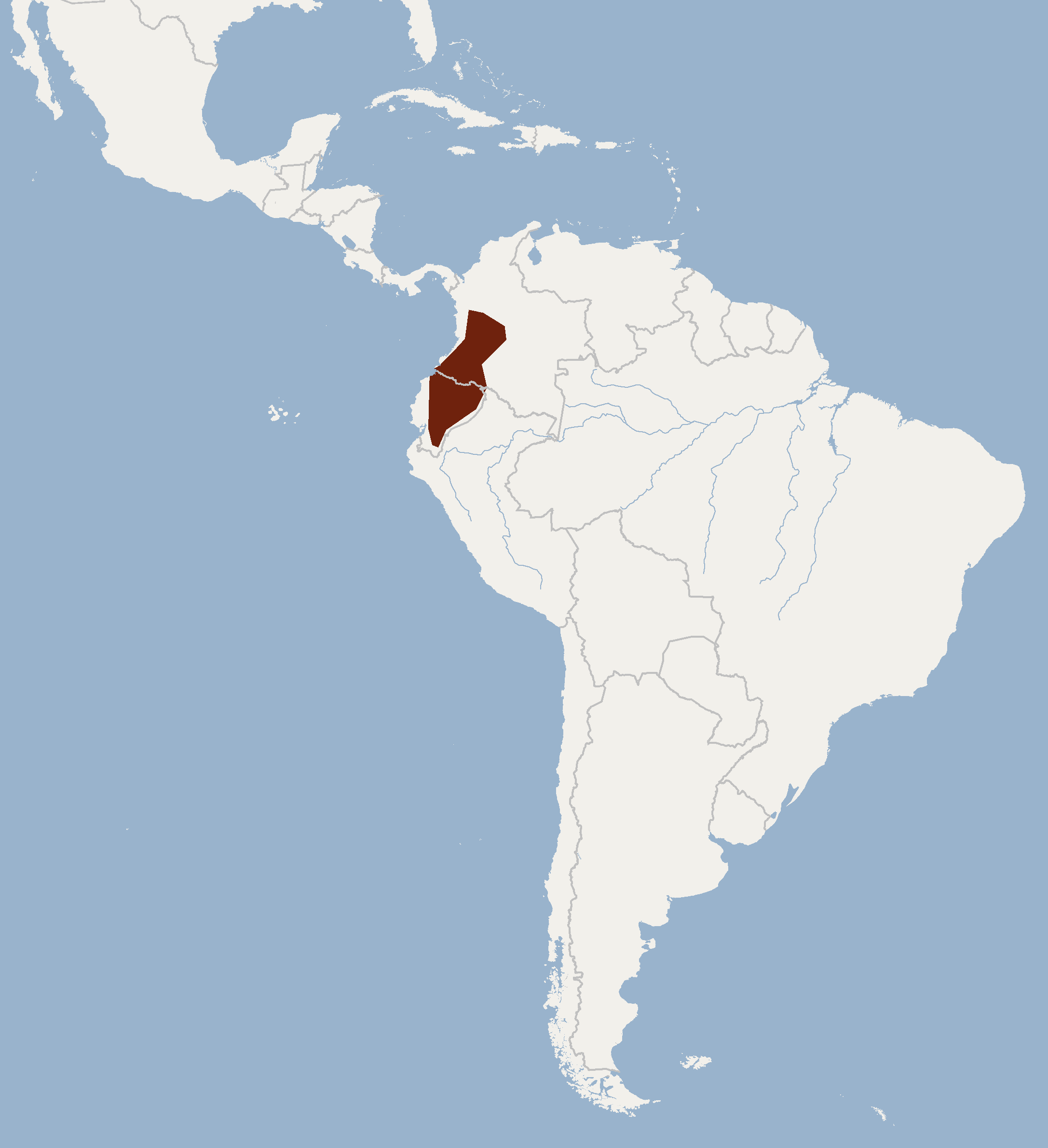

Species of bat

The highland yellow-shouldered bat (Sturnira ludovici) is a species of bat in the family Phyllostomidae. It is found in Colombia, Costa Rica, Ecuador, El Salvador, Guatemala, Guyana, Honduras, Mexico, Nicaragua, Panama, and Venezuela.
