= List of mammals described in the 21st century =

The following is the list of mammals which have been taxonomically described in the 21st century.

== Living higher taxa ==
Name	Order	Author	Year	Distribution	Reference
Boreosphenida		Luo, Cifelli & Kielan-Jaworowska	2001		Luo, Z.-X., Cifelli, R.L. & Kielan-Jaworowska, Z. 2001. Dual origins of tribosphenic mammals. Nature 409:53–57.
Neoceti	Cetacea	Fordyce & de Muizon	2001		Fordyce, R.C. & de Muizon, C. 2001. Evolutionary history of the cetaceans: a review. Secondary Adaptations of Tetrapods to Life in the Water 169–233.
Platanistida		Fordyce & de Muizon	2001		Fordyce, R.C. & de Muizon, C. 2001. Evolutionary history of the cetaceans: a review. Secondary Adaptations of Tetrapods to Life in the Water 169–233.
Baiomyini	Rodentia	Musser & Carleton	2005		Musser G. G, Carleton M. D. 2005. Superfamily Muroidea. Pp. 894–1531 in Mammal species of the world: a taxonomic and geographic reference (Wilson D. E., Reeder D. M., eds.). 3rd ed. Johns Hopkins University Press, Baltimore, Maryland.
Ochrotomyini	Rodentia	Musser & Carleton	2005		Musser G. G, Carleton M. D. 2005. Superfamily Muroidea. Pp. 894–1531 in Mammal species of the world: a taxonomic and geographic reference (Wilson D. E., Reeder D. M., eds.). 3rd ed. Johns Hopkins University Press, Baltimore, Maryland.
Abrotrichini	Rodentia	D'Elía, Pardiñas, Teta & Patton	2007	Argentina, Bolivia, Chile, Peru	D'Elía, G., Pardiñas, U.F.J., Teta, P. & Patton, J.L. (2007). "Definition and diagnosis of a new tribe of sigmodontine rodents (Cricetidae: Sigmodontinae), and a revised classification of the subfamily" (PDF). Gayana. 71 (2): 187–194. doi:10.4067/s0717-65382007000200007.
Apodemini	Rodentia	Lecompte, Aplin, Denys, Catzeflis, Chades & Chevret	2008		Lecompte, E.; Aplin, K.; Denys, C.; Catzeflis, F.; Chades, M.; Chevret, P. (2008). "Phylogeny and biogeography of African Murinae based on mitochondrial and nuclear gene sequences, with a new tribal classification of the subfamily". BMC Evolutionary Biology. 8: 199. doi:10.1186/1471-2148-8-199. PMC 2490707. PMID 18616808.
Arvicanthini	Rodentia	Lecompte, Aplin, Denys, Catzeflis, Chades & Chevret	2008		Lecompte, E.; Aplin, K.; Denys, C.; Catzeflis, F.; Chades, M.; Chevret, P. (2008). "Phylogeny and biogeography of African Murinae based on mitochondrial and nuclear gene sequences, with a new tribal classification of the subfamily". BMC Evolutionary Biology. 8: 199. doi:10.1186/1471-2148-8-199. PMC 2490707. PMID 18616808.
Malacomyini	Rodentia	Lecompte, Aplin, Denys, Catzeflis, Chades & Chevret	2008		Lecompte, E.; Aplin, K.; Denys, C.; Catzeflis, F.; Chades, M.; Chevret, P. (2008). "Phylogeny and biogeography of African Murinae based on mitochondrial and nuclear gene sequences, with a new tribal classification of the subfamily". BMC Evolutionary Biology. 8: 199. doi:10.1186/1471-2148-8-199. PMC 2490707. PMID 18616808.
Millardini	Rodentia	Lecompte, Aplin, Denys, Catzeflis, Chades & Chevret	2008		Lecompte, E.; Aplin, K.; Denys, C.; Catzeflis, F.; Chades, M.; Chevret, P. (2008). "Phylogeny and biogeography of African Murinae based on mitochondrial and nuclear gene sequences, with a new tribal classification of the subfamily". BMC Evolutionary Biology. 8: 199. doi:10.1186/1471-2148-8-199. PMC 2490707. PMID 18616808.
Praomyini	Rodentia	Lecompte, Aplin, Denys, Catzeflis, Chades & Chevret	2008		Lecompte, E.; Aplin, K.; Denys, C.; Catzeflis, F.; Chades, M.; Chevret, P. (2008). "Phylogeny and biogeography of African Murinae based on mitochondrial and nuclear gene sequences, with a new tribal classification of the subfamily". BMC Evolutionary Biology. 8: 199. doi:10.1186/1471-2148-8-199. PMC 2490707. PMID 18616808.
Cistugidae	Chiroptera	Lack, Roehrs, Stanley, Ruedi & Van Den Bussche	2010		Lack, J.B.; Roehrs, Z.P.; Stanley, C.E.; Ruedi, M.; Van Den Bussche, R.A. (2010). "Molecular phylogenetics of Myotis indicate familial-level divergence for the genus Cistugo (Chiroptera)". Journal of Mammalogy. 91 (4): 976–992. doi:10.1644/09-mamm-a-192.1.
Stenonycterini	Chiroptera	Nesi, Kadjo, Pourrut, Leroy, Pongombo, Shongo, Cruaud & Hassanin	2012		Nesi, N.; Kadjo, B.; Pourrut, X.; Leroy, E.M.; Pongombo Shongo, C.; Cruad, C.; Hassanin, A. (2013). "Molecular systematics and phylogeography of the tribe Myonycterini (Mammalia, Pteropodidae) inferred from mitochondrial and nuclear markers". Molecular Phylogenetics and Evolution. 66 (1): 126–137. doi:10.1016/j.ympev.2012.09.028. PMID 23063885.
Hsunycterini	Chiroptera	Parlos, Timm, Zwier, Zeballos & Baker	2014		Parlos, J.A.; Timm, R.M.; Swier, Z.J.; Zeballos, H.; Baker, R.J. (2014). "Evaluation of the paraphyletic assemblage within Lonchophyllinae, with description of a new tribe and genus". Occasional Papers, Museum of Texas Tech University. 320: i + 1–23.
Euneomyini	Rodentia	Pardiñas, Teta & Salazar-Bravo	2015	Peru, Chile, Argentina	Pardiñas, U.F.J.; Teta, P.; Salazar-Bravo, J. (2015). "A new tribe of Sigmodontinae rodents (Cricetidae)". Mastozoologia Neotropical. 22 (1): 171–186.
Setonichini	Diprotodontia	Jackson & Groves	2015	Australia	Jackson, S. Groves, C. (2015). Taxonomy of Australian Mammals. Csiro Publishing. ISBN 978-1-4863-0014-3.
Eidolinae	Chiroptera	Almeida, Giannini & Simmons	2016		Almeida, F.C.; Giannini, N.P.; Simmons, N.B. (2016). "The Evolutionary History of the African Fruit Bats (Chiroptera: Pteropodidae)". Acta Chiropterologica. 18 (1): 73–90. doi:10.3161/15081109ACC2016.18.1.003. hdl:11336/12847. S2CID 89415407.

== Living genera ==
Name	Order	Author	Year	Distribution	Reference
Juliomys	Rodentia	González	2000	Argentina (Misiones), Brazil (Espirito Santo, Minas Gerais, Parana, Rio de Janeiro, Santa Catarina, São Paulo)	González, E.M. 2000. Un nuevo genero do roedor sigmodontino de Argentina y Brazil (Mammalia: Rodentia: Sigmodontinae). Comunicaciones Zoologicas del Museo de Historia Natural de Montevideo 12:1–12.
Pipanacoctomys	Rodentia	Mares, Braun, Barquez & Diaz	2000	Argentina (Catamarca)	Mares, M. A., Braun, J.K., Bárquez, R.M., & Díaz, M.M. Two new genera and species of halophytic desert mammals from isolated salt flats in Argentina. Occasional Papers, Museum of Texas Tech University, 203:1–27.
Salinoctomys	Rodentia	Mares, Braun, Barquez & Diaz	2000	Argentina (La Rioja)	Mares, M. A., Braun, J.K., Barquez, R.M., & Diaz, M.M. Two new genera and species of halophytic desert mammals from isolated salt flats in Argentina. Occasional Papers, Museum of Texas Tech University, 203:1–27.
Tapecomys	Rodentia	Anderson & Yates	2000	Bolivia	Anderson, S. & Yates, T.L. 2000 A new genus and species of phyllotine rodent from Bolivia. Journal of Mammalogy 81(1):18–36.
Hyladelphys	Didelphimorphia	Voss, Lunde & Simmons	2001	Brazil, French Guiana, Guyana, Peru	Voss, R.S., Lunde, D.P. & Simmons, N.B. 2001. Mammals of Paracou, French Guiana: a Neotropical lowland rainforest fauna. Part 2. Nonvolant species. Bulletin of the American Museum of Natural History 263:1–236.
Handleyomys	Rodentia	Voss, Gómez-Laverde & Pacheco	2002		Voss, R.S., Gomez-Laverde, M. & Pacheco, V. 2002. A New Genus for Aepeomys fuscatus Allen, 1912, and Oryzomys intectus Thomas, 1921: Enigmatic Murid Rodents from Andean Cloud Forests. American Museum Novitates 3373:1–42.
Sommeromys	Rodentia	Musser & Durden	2002		Musser, G.G. & Durden, L.A. 2002. Sulawesi rodents: description of a new species of Murinae (Muridae, Rodentia) and its parasitic new species of sucking louse (Insecta, Anoplura). American Museum Novitates 3368:1–50.
Chacodelphys	Didelphimorphia	Voss, Gardner & Jansa	2004		Voss, R.S., Gardner, A.L. & Jansa, S.A. 2002. On the Relationships of "Marmosa" formosa Shamel, 1930 (Marsupialia: Didelphidae), a Phylogenetic Puzzle from the Chaco of Northern Argentina. American Museum Novitates 3442:1–18.
Drymoreomys	Rodentia	Percequillo, Weksler & Costa	2011	Brazil (Santa Catarina, São Paulo)	Percequillo A.R., Weksler M., Costa L.P. (2011). "A new genus and species of rodent from the Brazilian Atlantic Forest (Rodentia: Cricetidae: Sigmodontinae: Oryzomyini), with comments on oryzomyine biogeography". Zoological Journal of the Linnean Society. 161 (2): 357–390. doi:10.1111/j.1096-3642.2010.00643.x.
Paynomys	Rodentia	Teta, Cañon, Patterson & Pardiñas	2016		Teta, P.; Cañon, C.; Patterson, B.D.; Pardiñas, U.F.J. (2016). "Phylogeny of the tribe Abrotrichini (Cricetidae, Sigmodontinae): integrating morphological and molecular evidence into a new classification". Cladistics. 33 (2): 153–182. doi:10.1111/cla.12164. hdl:11336/36698. PMID 34710969. S2CID 88451880.
Petrosaltator	Macroscelidea	Dumbacher & Rathbun	2016		John P. Dumbacher, Elizabeth J. Carlen and Galen B. Rathbun (2016). "Petrosaltator gen. nov., a new genus replacement for the North African sengi Elephantulus rozeti (Macroscelidea; Macroscelididae)". Zootaxa. 4136 (3): 567–579. doi:10.11646/zootaxa.4136.3.8. PMID 27395734.
Pseudoromicia	Chiroptera	Monadjem, Patterson, Webala & Demos	2020		Monadjem, A.; Demos, T.C.; Dalton, D.L.; Webala, P.W.; Musila, S.; Kerbis Peterhans, J.C.; Patterson, B.D. (2020). "A revision of pipistrelle-like bats (Mammalia: Chiroptera: Vespertilionidae) in East Africa with the description of description of new genera and species". Zoological Journal of the Linnean Society. doi:10.1093/zoolinnean/zlaa087. hdl:2263/84301.
Afronycteris	Chiroptera	Monadjem, Patterson, & Demos	2020		Monadjem, A.; Demos, T.C.; Dalton, D.L.; Webala, P.W.; Musila, S.; Kerbis Peterhans, J.C.; Patterson, B.D. (2020). "A revision of pipistrelle-like bats (Mammalia: Chiroptera: Vespertilionidae) in East Africa with the description of description of new genera and species". Zoological Journal of the Linnean Society. doi:10.1093/zoolinnean/zlaa087. hdl:2263/84301.

== Living subgenera ==
Name	Order	Author	Year	Distribution	Reference
Cryptomustela	Carnivora	Abramov	2000		Abramov, A.V. 2000. A taxonomic review of the genus Mustela (Mammalia, Carnivora). Zoosystematica Rossica 8(2):357–364.
Vocalomys	Rodentia	Golenishchev & Malikov	2006		Golenishchev F.N.; Malikov V.G. (2006). "The "developmental conduit" of the tribe Microtini (Rodentia, Arvicolinae): Systematic and evolutionary aspects". Russian Journal of Theriology. 5 (1): 17–24. doi:10.15298/rusjtheriol.05.1.03.
Afropipistrellus	Chiroptera	Thorn, Kock & Cuisin	2007		Thorn, E., Kock, D. & Cuisin, J. 2007. Status of the African bats Vesperugo grandidieri Dobson, 1876 and Vesperugo flavescens Seabra, 1900 (Chiroptera, Vespertilionidae), with description of a new subgenus. Mammalia 71(1–2):70–79.
Hyrcanicola	Rodentia	Nadachowski	2007	Azerbaijan, Iran	Nadachowski, A. 2007. The taxonomic status of Schelkovnikov's Pine Vole Microtus schelkovnikovi (Rodentia, Mammalia). Acta zoologica cracoviensia 50A(1–2):67–72.
Leuconycteris	Chiroptera	Porter, Hoofer, Cline, Hoffmann & Baker	2007	Brazil, Colombia, Ecuador, French Guiana, Guyana, Peru, Venezuela	Porter, C.A., Hoofer, S.R., Cline, C.A., Hoffmann, F.G. & Baker, R.J. 2007. Molecular phylogenetics of the phyllostomid bat genus Micronycteris with descriptions of two new subgenera. Journal of Mammalogy 88(5):1205–1215.
Schizonycteris	Chiroptera	Porter, Hoofer, Cline, Hoffmann & Baker	2007	Central and South America	Porter, C.A., Hoofer, S.R., Cline, C.A., Hoffmann, F.G. & Baker, R.J. 2007. Molecular phylogenetics of the phyllostomid bat genus Micronycteris with descriptions of two new subgenera. Journal of Mammalogy 88(5):1205–1215.
Megapomys	Rodentia	Heaney, Balete, Rickart, Alviola, M.R.M.Duya, M.V.Duya, Veluz, VandeVrede & Steppan	2011	Philippines (Luzon)	Heaney, L.R., Balete, D.S., Rickart, E.A., Alviola, P.A., Duya, M.R.M., Duya, M.V., Veluz, M.J., VandeVrede, L. & Steppan, S.J. 2011. Chapter 1: Seven New Species and a New Subgenus of Forest Mice (Rodentia: Muridae: Apomys) from Luzon Island. Fieldiana Life and Earth Sciences 2:1–60.
Eomarmosa	Didelphimorphia	Voss, Gutiérrez, Solari, Rossi & Jansa	2014		Voss, RS.; Gutiérrez, E.E.; Solari, S.; Rossi, R.V.; Jansa, S.A. (2014). "Phylogenetic Relationships of Mouse Opossums (Didelphidae, Marmosa) with a Revised Subgeneric Classification and Notes on Sympatric Diversity". American Museum Novitates (3817): 1–27. doi:10.1206/3817.1. hdl:10495/25588. S2CID 52082932.
Exulomarmosa	Didelphimorphia	Voss, Gutiérrez, Solari, Rossi & Jansa	2014		Voss, RS.; Gutiérrez, E.E.; Solari, S.; Rossi, R.V.; Jansa, S.A. (2014). "Phylogenetic Relationships of Mouse Opossums (Didelphidae, Marmosa) with a Revised Subgeneric Classification and Notes on Sympatric Diversity". American Museum Novitates (3817): 1–27. doi:10.1206/3817.1. hdl:10495/25588. S2CID 52082932.
Ozimops	Chiroptera	Reardon, McKenzie, Cooper, Appleton, Carthew & Adams	2014		Reardon, T.B.; McKenzie, N.L.; Cooper, S.J.B.; Appleton, B.; Carthew, S.; Adams, M. (2014). "A molecular and morphological investigation of species boundaries and phylogenetic relationships in Australian free-tailed bats Mormopterus (Chiroptera: Molossidae)". Australian Journal of Zoology. 62 (2): 109–136. doi:10.1071/ZO13082. hdl:10536/DRO/DU:30070309.
Setirostris	Chiroptera	Reardon, McKenzie, Cooper, Appleton, Carthew & Adams	2014		Reardon, T.B.; McKenzie, N.L.; Cooper, S.J.B.; Appleton, B.; Carthew, S.; Adams, M. (2014). "A molecular and morphological investigation of species boundaries and phylogenetic relationships in Australian free-tailed bats Mormopterus (Chiroptera: Molossidae)". Australian Journal of Zoology. 62 (2): 109–136. doi:10.1071/ZO13082. hdl:10536/DRO/DU:30070309.
Angelomys	Rodentia	Teta, Cañon, Patterson & Pardiñas	2016		Teta, P.; Cañon, C.; Patterson, B.D.; Pardiñas, U.F.J. (2016). "Phylogeny of the tribe Abrotrichini (Cricetidae, Sigmodontinae): integrating morphological and molecular evidence into a new classification". Cladistics. 33 (2): 153–182. doi:10.1111/cla.12164. hdl:11336/36698. PMID 34710969. S2CID 88451880.
Pegamys	Rodentia	Teta, Cañon, Patterson & Pardiñas	2016		Teta, P.; Cañon, C.; Patterson, B.D.; Pardiñas, U.F.J. (2016). "Phylogeny of the tribe Abrotrichini (Cricetidae, Sigmodontinae): integrating morphological and molecular evidence into a new classification". Cladistics. 33 (2): 153–182. doi:10.1111/cla.12164. hdl:11336/36698. PMID 34710969. S2CID 88451880.
Sciophanes	Didelphimorphia	Díaz-Nieto, Jansa & Voss	2016		Díaz-Nieto, J.F.; Jansa, S.A.; Voss, R.S. (2016). "DNA sequencing reveals unexpected Recent diversity and an ancient dichotomy in the American marsupial genus Marmosops (Didelphidae: Thylamyini)". Zoological Journal of the Linnean Society. 176 (4): 914–940. doi:10.1111/zoj.12343. hdl:10784/26738.

== Living species ==
Name	Order	Author	Year	Distribution	Reference
Akodon oenos	Rodentia	Braun, Mares & Ojeda	2000	Argentina (Mendoza)	Braun, J.K., Mares, M.A. & Ojeda, R.A. 2000. A new species of grass mouse, genus Akodon (Muridae: Sigmodontinae), from Mendoza Province, Argentina. Zeitschrift für Säugetierkunde 65:216–225.
Akodon paranaensis	Rodentia	Christoff, Fagundes, Sbalqueiro, Mattevi & Yonenaga-Yassuda	2000	Argentina (Misiones), Brazil (Parana, Rio Grande do Sul)	Christoff, A.U., Fagundes, V., Sbalqueiro, I.J., Mattevi, M.S. & Yonenaga-Yassuda, Y. 2000. Description of a new species of Akodon (Rodentia: Sigmodontinae) from southern Brazil. Journal of Mammalogy 81(3):838–851.
Amblysomus robustus	Afrosoricida	Bronner	2000	South Africa (Mpumalanga)	Bronner, G.N. 2000. New species and subspecies of golden mole (Chrysochloridae: Amblysomus) from Mpumalanga, South Africa. Mammalia 64:41–54.
Antechinus subtropicus	Dasyuromorphia	Van Dyck & Crowther	2000	Australia (New South Wales, Queensland)	Van Dyck, S. & Crowther, M.S. 2000. Reassessment of northern representatives of the Antechinus stuartii complex (Marsupialia: Dasyuridae): A. subtropicus sp. nov. and A. adustus new status. Memoirs of the Queensland Museum, vol. 45, part 2, pp. 611–635.
Avahi unicolor	Primates	Thalmann & Geissmann	2000	Madagascar	Thalmann, U. & Geissmann, T. 2000. Distribution and Geographic Variation in the Western Woolly Lemur (Avahi occidentalis) with Description of a New Species (A. unicolor). International Journal of Primatology 21(6):915–941.
Brucepattersonius guarani	Rodentia	Mares & Braun	2000	Argentina (Misiones)	Mares, M.A. & Braun, J.K. 2000. Three new species of Brucepattersonius (Rodentia: Sigmodontinae) from Misiones Province, Argentina. Occasional Papers of the Sam Noble Oklahoma Museum of Natural History 9:1–13.
Brucepattersonius misionensis	Rodentia	Mares & Braun	2000	Argentina (Misiones)	Mares, M.A. & Braun, J.K. 2000. Three new species of Brucepattersonius (Rodentia: Sigmodontinae) from Misiones Province, Argentina. Occasional Papers of the Sam Noble Oklahoma Museum of Natural History 9:1–13.
Brucepattersonius paradisus	Rodentia	Mares & Braun	2000	Argentina (Misiones)	Mares, M.A. & Braun, J.K. 2000. Three new species of Brucepattersonius (Rodentia: Sigmodontinae) from Misiones Province, Argentina. Occasional Papers of the Sam Noble Oklahoma Museum of Natural History 9:1–13.
Cheirogaleus adipicaudatus	Primates	Groves	2000	Madagascar	Groves, C.P. 2000. The Genus Cheirogaleus: Unrecognized Biodiversity in Dwarf Lemurs. International Journal of Primatology 21(6):943–962.
Cheirogaleus minusculus	Primates	Groves	2000	Madagascar	Groves, C.P. 2000. The Genus Cheirogaleus: Unrecognized Biodiversity in Dwarf Lemurs. International Journal of Primatology 21(6):943–962.
Cheirogaleus ravus	Primates	Groves	2000	Madagascar	Groves, C.P. 2000. The Genus Cheirogaleus: Unrecognized Biodiversity in Dwarf Lemurs. International Journal of Primatology 21(6):943–962.
Ctenomys paraguayensis	Rodentia	Contreras	2000	Paraguay	Contreras, J.R. (2000). "Ctenomys paraguayensis, una nueva especie de roedor excavador procedente del Paraguay Oriental (Mammalia, Rodentia, Ctenomyidae)". Rev. Mus. Argentino Cienc. Nat. N.S. 2 (1): 61–68. doi:10.22179/REVMACN.2.125.
Lophuromys angolensis	Rodentia	Verheyen, Dierckx & Hulselmans	2000	Angola	Verheyen, W.; Dierckx, T.; Hulselmans, J. (2000). "The brush-furred rats of Angola and southern congo: description of a new taxon of the Lophuromys sikapusi complex". Bulletin van het Koninklijk Belgisch Instituut voor Natuurwetenschappen: Biologie. 70: 253–267.
Mesomys occultus	Rodentia	Patton, Da Silva & Malcolm	2000	Brazil (Amazonas)	Patton, J.L., da Silva, M.N.F. & Malcolm, J.R. 2000. Mammals of the Rio Juruá and the evolutionary and ecological diversification in Amazonia. Bulletin of the American Museum of Natural History 244:1–306.
Mico acariensis	Primates	Van Roosmalen, Van Roosmalen, Mittermeier & Rylands	2000	Brazil (Amazonas)	Roosmalen, M.G.M. van, Roosmalen, T. van, Mittermeier, R.A. & Rylands, A.B. 2000. Two new species of marmoset, genus Callithrix Erxleben, 1777 (Callitrichidae, Primates), from the Tapájos/Madeira interfluvium, south central Amazonia, Brazil. Neotropical Primates 8(1):2–19.
Mico manicorensis	Primates	Van Roosmalen, Van Roosmalen, Mittermeier & Rylands	2000	Brazil (Amazonas)	Roosmalen, M.G.M. van, Roosmalen, T. van, Mittermeier, R.A. & Rylands, A.B. 2000. Two new species of marmoset, genus Callithrix Erxleben, 1777 (Callitrichidae, Primates), from the Tapájos/Madeira interfluvium, south central Amazonia, Brazil. Neotropical Primates 8(1):2–19.
Microcebus berthae	Primates	Rasoloarison, Goodman & Ganzhorn	2000	Madagascar	Rasoloarison, R.M., Goodman, S.M., & Ganzhorn, J.U. 2000. Taxonomic revision of mouse lemurs (Microcebus) in the western portions of Madagascar. International Journal of Primatology. 21(6):963–1019.
Microcebus sambiranensis	Primates	Rasoloarison, Goodman & Ganzhorn	2000	Madagascar	Rasoloarison, R.M., Goodman, S.M., & Ganzhorn, J.U. 2000. Taxonomic revision of mouse lemurs (Microcebus) in the western portions of Madagascar. International Journal of Primatology. 21(6):963–1019.
Microcebus tavaratra	Primates	Rasoloarison, Goodman & Ganzhorn	2000	Madagascar	Rasoloarison, R.M., Goodman, S.M., & Ganzhorn, J.U. 2000. Taxonomic revision of mouse lemurs (Microcebus) in the western portions of Madagascar. International Journal of Primatology. 21(6):963–1019.
Myosorex kihaulei	Eulipotyphla	Stanley & Hutterer	2000	Tanzania	Stanley, W.T. & Hutterer, R. 2000. A new species of Myosorex Gray 1832 (Mammalia: Soricidae) from the Eastern Arc mountains, Tanzania. Bonner Zoologische Beitraege 49(1–4):19–29.
Neacomys minutus	Rodentia	Patton, Da Silva & Malcolm	2000	Brazil	Patton, J.L., da Silva, M.N.F. & Malcolm, J.R. 2000. Mammals of the Rio Juruá and the evolutionary and ecological diversification in Amazonia. Bulletin of the American Museum of Natural History 244:1–306.
Neacomys musseri	Rodentia	Patton, Da Silva & Malcolm	2000	Brazil, Peru	Patton, J.L., da Silva, M.N.F. & Malcolm, J.R. 2000. Mammals of the Rio Juruá and the evolutionary and ecological diversification in Amazonia. Bulletin of the American Museum of Natural History 244:1–306.
Nesolagus timminsi	Lagomorpha	Abramov, Averianov & Tikhonov	2000	Laos, Vietnam	Averianov, A.O., Abramov, A.V. & Tikhonov, A.N. 2000. A new species of Nesolagus (Lagomorpha, Leporidae) from Vietnam with osteological description. Contributions from the Zoological Institute, St. Petersburg 3:1–22.
Notiosorex villai	Eulipotyphla	Carraway & Timm	2000	Mexico (Tamaulipas)	Carraway, L.N. & Timm, R.M. 2000. Revision of the extant taxa of the genus Notiosorex (Mammalia: Insectivora: Soricidae). Proceedings of the Biological Society of Washington 113:302–318.
Ochotona nigritia	Lagomorpha	Gong, Wang & Li	2000	China (Yunnan)	Gong, Z.-D., Wang, Y.-X., Li, Z.-H., & Li, S.-Q. 2000. A new species of pika Pianma blacked pika Ochotona nigritia (Lagomorpha: Ochotonidae) from Yunnan, China. Zoological Research 21(3):204–209.
Pipanacoctomys aureus	Rodentia	Mares, Braun, Barquez & Diaz	2000	Argentina (Catamarca)	Mares, M. A., Braun, J.K., Barquez, R.M., & Diaz, M.M. 2000. Two new genera and species of halophytic desert mammals from isolated salt flats in Argentina. Occasional Papers, Museum of Texas Tech University, 203:1–27.
Plecotus balensis	Chiroptera	Kruskop & Lavrenchenko	2000	Ethiopia	Kruskop, S.V. & Lavrenchenko, L.A. 2000. A new species of long-eared bat (Plecotus; Vespertilionidae, Mammalia) from Ethiopia. Myotis 38:5–17.
Pseudantechinus roryi	Dasyuromorphia	Coopers, Aplin & Adams	2000	Australia (Western Australia)	Cooper, N.K., Aplin, K.P. & Adams, M. 2000. A new species of false antechinus (Marsupialia: Dasyuromorphis: Dasyuridae) from the Pilbara region, Western Australia. Records of the Western Australian Museum 20:115–136.
Rhinolophus maendeleo	Chiroptera	Kock, Csorba & Howell	2000	Tanzania	Kock, D., Csorba, G. & Howell, K.M. 2000. Rhinolophus maendeleo n. sp. from Tanzania, a horseshoe bat noteworthy for its systematics and biogeography. Senckenbergiana biologica 80(1–2):233–239.
Rhipidomys gardneri	Rodentia	Patton, Da Silva & Malcolm	2000	Brazil (Acre), Peru	Patton, J.L., da Silva, M.N.F. & Malcolm, J.R. 2000. Mammals of the Rio Juruá and the evolutionary and ecological diversification in Amazonia. Bulletin of the American Museum of Natural History 244:1–306.
Salinoctomys loschalchalerosorum	Rodentia	Mares, Braun, Barquez & Diaz	2000	Argentina (La Rioja)	Mares, M. A., Braun, J.K., Barquez, R.M., & Diaz, M.M. 2000. Two new genera and species of halophytic desert mammals from isolated salt flats in Argentina. Occasional Papers, Museum of Texas Tech University, 203:1–27.
Tapecomys primus	Rodentia	Anderson & Yates	2000	Bolivia	Anderson, S. & Yates, T.L. 2000. A new genus and species of phyllotine rodent from Bolivia. Journal of Mammalogy 81(1):18–36.
Aepeomys reigi	Rodentia	Ochoa, Aguilera, Pacheco & Soriano	2001	Venezuela	Ochoa G., J., Aguilera, M., Pacheco, V. & Soriano, P.J. 2001. A new species of Aepeomys Thomas, 1898 (Rodentia: Muridae) from the Andes of Venezuela. Mammalian Biology 66:228–237.
Bradypus pygmaeus	Pilosa	Anderson & Handley	2001	Panama	Anderson, R.P. & Handley, C.O., Jr. 2001. A new species of three-toed sloth (Mammalia: Xenarthra) from Panamá, with a review of the genus Bradypus. Proceedings of the Biological Society of Washington 114:1–33.
Carollia colombiana	Chiroptera	Cuartas, Muñoz & Míriam González	2001	Colombia	Cuartas, C.A., Muñoz, J. & González, M. 2001. Una nueva especie de Carollia Gray, 1838 (Chiroptera: Phyllostomidae) de Colombia. Actualidades Biológicas 23(75):63–73.
Ctenomys lami	Rodentia	De Freitas	2001	Brazil (Rio Grande do Sul)	Freitas, T.R.O. 2001. Tuco-tucos (Rodentia, Octodontidae) in Southern Brazil: Ctenomys lami spec. nov. Separated from C. minutus Nehring 1887. Studies on Neotropical Fauna and Environment, 36(1):1–8.
Eliurus antsingy	Rodentia	Carleton, Goodman & Rakotondravony	2001	Madagascar	Carleton, M.D, Goodman, S.M. & Rakotondravony, D. 2001. A new species of tufted-tailed rat, genus Eliurus (Muridae: Nesomyinae), from western Madagascar, with notes on the distribution of E. myoxinus. Proceedings of the Biological Society of Washington 14:972–987.
Glauconycteris curryae	Chiroptera	Eger & Schlitter	2001	Cameroon, Congo (Dem.Rep.)	Eger, J.L. & Schlitter, D.A. 2001. A new species of Glauconycteris from West Africa (Chiroptera: Vespertilionidae). Acta Chiropterologica 3(1):1–10.
Microtus anatolicus	Rodentia	Kryštufek & Kefioğlu	2001	Turkey	Kryštufek, B. & Kefelioğlu, H. 2001. Redescription and species limits of Microtus irani Thomas, 1921, and description of a new social vole from Turkey (Mammalia: Arvicolinae). Bonner zoologische Beiträge 50(1–2):1–14.
Myotis alcathoe	Chiroptera	Von Helversen & Heller	2001	Bulgaria, Czech Republic, France, Germany, Greece, Hungary, Montenegro, Serbia, Slovakia, Spain, Switzerland	Von Helversen, O. & Heller, K.G. in Von Helversen, O., Heller, K.G., Mayer, F., Nemeth, A., Volleth, M. & Gombkötö, B. 2001. Cryptic mammalian species: a new species of whiskered bat (Myotis alcathoe n. sp.) in Europe. Naturwissenschaften 88(5):217–223.
Myotis annamiticus	Chiroptera	Kruskop & Tsytsulina	2001	Vietnam	Kruskop, S.V. & Tsytsulina, K.A. 2001. A new big-footed mouse-eared bat Myotis annamiticus sp. nov. (Vespertilionidae, Chiroptera) from Vietnam. Mammalia 65(1):63–72.
Neacomys dubosti	Rodentia	Voss, Lunde & Simmons	2001	Brazil (Amapa), French Guiana, Suriname	Voss, R.S., Lunde, D.P. & Simmons, N.B. 2001. Mammals of Paracou, French Guiana: a Neotropical lowland rainforest fauna. Part 2. Nonvolant species. Bulletin of the American Museum of Natural History 263:1–236.
Neacomys paracou	Rodentia	Voss, Lunde & Simmons	2001	Brazil (Amapa, Amazonas, Para), French Guiana, Guyana, Suriname, Venezuela	Voss, R.S., Lunde, D.P. & Simmons, N.B. 2001. Mammals of Paracou, French Guiana: a Neotropical lowland rainforest fauna. Part 2. Nonvolant species. Bulletin of the American Museum of Natural History 263:1–236.
Paranyctimene tenax	Chiroptera	Bergmans	2001	Indonesia (Irian Jaya, Waigeo), Papua New Guinea (New Guinea)	Bergmans, W. 2001. Notes on distribution and taxonomy of Australasian bats. I. Pteropodinae and Nyctimeninae (Mammalia, Megachiroptera, Pteropodidae). Beaufortia 51:119–152.
Saccopteryx antioquensis	Chiroptera	Muñoz & Cuartas	2001	Colombia	Muñoz J. & Cuartas, C.A.. 2001. Saccopteryx antioquensis n. sp. (Chiroptera: Emballonuridae) del noroeste de Colombia. Actualidades Biológicas 23(75): 53–61.
Spalax carmeli	Rodentia	Nevo, Ivanitskaya & Bailes	2001	Israel	Nevo, E., Ivanitskaya, E. & Beiles, A. 2001. Adaptive radiation of blind subterranean mole rats: naming and revisiting the four sibling species of the Spalax ehrenbergi superspecies in Israel: Spalax galili (2n=52), S. golani (2n=54), S. carmeli (2n=58) and S. judaei (2n=60). Leyden, The Netherlands: Bachkhuys Publishers.
Spalax galili	Rodentia	Nevo, Ivanitskaya & Bailes	2001	Israel	Nevo, E., Ivanitskaya, E. & Beiles, A. 2001. Adaptive radiation of blind subterranean mole rats: naming and revisiting the four sibling species of the Spalax ehrenbergi superspecies in Israel: Spalax galili (2n=52), S. golani (2n=54), S. carmeli (2n=58) and S. judaei (2n=60). Leyden, The Netherlands: Bachkhuys Publishers.
Spalax golani	Rodentia	Nevo, Ivanitskaya & Bailes	2001	Golan Heights	Nevo, E., Ivanitskaya, E. & Beiles, A. 2001. Adaptive radiation of blind subterranean mole rats: naming and revisiting the four sibling species of the Spalax ehrenbergi superspecies in Israel: Spalax galili (2n=52), S. golani (2n=54), S. carmeli (2n=58) and S. judaei (2n=60). Leyden, The Netherlands: Bachkhuys Publishers.
Spalax judaei	Rodentia	Nevo, Ivanitskaya & Bailes	2001	Israel	Nevo, E., Ivanitskaya, E. & Beiles, A. 2001. Adaptive radiation of blind subterranean mole rats: naming and revisiting the four sibling species of the Spalax ehrenbergi superspecies in Israel: Spalax galili (2n=52), S. golani (2n=54), S. carmeli (2n=58) and S. judaei (2n=60). Leyden, The Netherlands: Bachkhuys Publishers.
Sphiggurus ichillus	Rodentia	Voss & da Silva	2001	Ecuador	Voss, R.S. & da Silva, M.N.F. 2001. Revisionary Notes on Neotropical Porcupines (Rodentia: Erethizontidae). 2. A Review of the Coendou vestitus Group with Descriptions of Two New Species from Amazonia. American Museum Novitates 3351:1–36.
Sphiggurus roosmalenorum	Rodentia	Voss & da Silva	2001	Brazil (Amazonas, Rondonia)	Voss, R.S. & da Silva, M.N.F. 2001. Revisionary Notes on Neotropical Porcupines (Rodentia: Erethizontidae). 2. A Review of the Coendou vestitus Group with Descriptions of Two New Species from Amazonia. American Museum Novitates 3351:1–36.
Sturnira mistratensis	Chiroptera	Contreras-Vega & Cadena	2001	Colombia	Contreras-Vega, M. & Cadena, A. 2001. Una nueva especie del género Sturnira (Chiroptera: Phyllostomidae) de los Andes Colombianos. Revista de la Academa Colombiana de Ciencias Exactas, Físicas y Naturales 26:285–287.
Sylvilagus varynaensis	Lagomorpha	Durant & Guevara	2001	Venezuela	Durant, P. & Guevara, M.A. 2001. A new rabbit species (Sylvilagus, Mammalia: Leporidae) from the lowlands of Venezuela. Revista Biologica Tropica 49(1):369–381.
Abrocoma uspallata	Rodentia	Braun & Mares	2002	Argentina (Mendoza)	Parnaby, H.E. 2002. Braun, J.K. & Mares, M.A. 2002. Systematics of the Abrocoma cinerea species complex (Rodentia: Abrocomidae), with a description of a new species of Abrocoma. Journal of Mammalogy 83(1):1–19.
Bullimus gamay	Rodentia	Rickart, Heaney & Tabaranza	2002	Philippines (Camiguin)	Rickart, E.A., Heaney, L.R. & Tabaranza, B.R., Jr. 2002. Review of Bullimus (Muridae: Murinae) and description of a new species from Camiguin Island, Philippines. Journal of Mammalogy 83(2):421–436.
Callicebus bernhardi	Primates	Van Roosmalen, Van Roosmalen & Mittermeier	2002	Brazil (Amazonas, Rondonia)	Roosmalen, M.G.M. van, Roosmalen, T. van & Mittermeier, R.A. 2002. A taxonomic review of the titi monkeys, genus Callicebus Thomas, 1903, with the description of two new species, Callicebus bernhardi and Callicebus stephennashi, from Brazilian Amazonia. Neotropical Primates 10(suppl.):1–52.
Callicebus stephennashi	Primates	Van Roosmalen, Van Roosmalen & Mittermeier	2002	Brazil (Amazonas)	Roosmalen, M.G.M. van, Roosmalen, T. van & Mittermeier, R.A. 2002. A taxonomic review of the titi monkeys, genus Callicebus Thomas, 1903, with the description of two new species, Callicebus bernhardi and Callicebus stephennashi, from Brazilian Amazonia. Neotropical Primates 10(suppl.):1–52.
Carollia sowelli	Chiroptera	Baker, Solari & Hoffmann	2002	Costa Rica, Guatemala, Honduras, Mexico, Panama	Baker, R.J., Solari, S. & Hoffmann, F.G. 2002. A new Central American species from the Carollia brevicauda complex. Occasional Papers, Museum of Texas Tech University 217: 1–12.
Congosorex verheyeni	Eulipotyphla	Hutterer, Barrière & Colyn	2002	Central African Republic, Congo	Hutterer, R., Barrière, P. & Colyn, M. 2002. A new myosoricine shrew from the Congo Basin referable to the forgotten genus Congosorex (Mammalia: Soricidae). Bulletin de l'Institut Royal des Sciences Naturelles de Belgique, Biologie 71(Suppl.):7–16.
Cryptotis tamensis	Eulipotyphla	Woodman	2002	Colombia, Venezuela	Woodman, N. 2002. A new species of small-eared shrew from Colombia and Venezuela (Mammalia: Soricomorpha: Soricidae: Genus Cryptotis). Proceedings of the Biological Society of Washington 115(2):249–272.
Dipodillus rupicola	Rodentia	Granjon, Aniskin, Volobouev & Sicard	2002	Mali	Granjon, L., Aniskin, V.M., Volobouev, V. & Sicard, B. 2002. Sand-dwellers in rocky habitats: a new species of Gerbillus (Mammalia: Rodentia) from Mali. Journal of Zoology 256: 181–190.
Gracilinanus ignitus	Didelphimorphia	Díaz, Flores & Barquez	2000	Argentina	Díaz, M.M.; Flores, D.A.; Barquez, R.M. (2002). "A New Species Of Gracile Mouse Opossum (Didelphimorphia: Didelphidae), From Argentina". Journal of Mammalogy. 83 (3): 824–833. doi:10.1644/1545-1542(2002)083<0824:ansogm>2.0.co;2.
Habromys delicatulus	Rodentia	Carleton, Sánchez & Urbano Vidales	2002	Mexico (Mexico)	Carleton, M.D., Sánchez, O. & Urbano Vidales, G. 2002. A new species of Habromys (Muroidea: Neotominae) from México, with generic review of species definitions and remarks on diversity patterns among Mesoamerican small mammals restricted to humid montane forests. Proceedings of the Biological Society of Washington 115: 488–533
Heteromys teleus	Rodentia	Anderson & Jarrín	2002	Ecuador	Anderson, R.P. & Jarrín-V., P. 2002. A New Species of Spiny Pocket Mouse (Heteromyidae: Heteromys) Endemic to Western Ecuador. American Museum Novitates 3382: 1–26
Juliomys rimofrons	Rodentia	Oliveira & Bonvicino	2002	Brazil	Oliveira, J.A.; Bonvicino, C.R. (2002). "A new species of sigmodontine rodent from the Atlantic forest of eastern Brazil". Acta Theriologica. 47 (3): 307–322. doi:10.1007/bf03194149. S2CID 34916706.
Lophuromys dudui	Rodentia	Verheyen, Hulselmans, Dierckx & Verheyen	2002	Democratic Republic of Congo	Verheyen W.; Hulselmans J.; Dierckx T.; Verheyen E. (2002). "The Lophuromys flavopunctatus Thomas 1888 s.l. species complex: A craniometric study with the description and genetic characterization of two new species (Rodentia - Muridae - Africa)". Bulletin de l'Institut Royal des Sciences Naturelles de Belgique. 72: 142–182.
Lophuromys verhageni	Rodentia	Verheyen, Hulselmans, Dierckx & Verheyen	2002	Tanzania	Verheyen W.; Hulselmans J.; Dierckx T.; Verheyen E. (2002). "The Lophuromys flavopunctatus Thomas 1888 s.l. species complex: A craniometric study with the description and genetic characterization of two new species (Rodentia - Muridae - Africa)". Bulletin de l'Institut Royal des Sciences Naturelles de Belgique. 72: 142–182.
Mesoplodon perrini	Cetacea	Dalebout, Mead, C.S.Baker, A.N.Baker & van Helden	2002	Pacific Ocean	Dalebout, M.L., Mead, J.G., Baker, C.S., Baker, A.N. & van Helden, A.L. 2002. A new species of Beaked Whale Mesoplodon perrini sp. n. (Cetacea: Ziphiidae) discovered through phylogenetic analyses of Mitochondrial DNA sequences. Marine Mammal Science 18(3):577.
Micronycteris matses	Chiroptera	Simmons, Voss & Fleck	2002	Peru	Simmons, N.B., Voss, R.S. & Fleck, D.W. 2002. A new Amazonian species of Micronycteris (Chiroptera: Phyllostomidae) with notes on the roosting behavior of sympatric congeners. American Museum Novitates 3358:1–14.
Nyctophilus nebulosus	Chiroptera	Parnaby	2002	New Caledonia	Parnaby, H.E. (2002). "A new species of long-eared bat (Nyctophilus: Vespertilionidae) from New Caledonia". Australian Mammalogy. 23 (2): 115–124. doi:10.1071/am01115. S2CID 87537165.
Oryzomys maracajuensis	Rodentia	Langguth & Bonvicino	2002	Brazil	Langguth, A.; Bonvicino, C.R. (2002). "The Oryzomys subflavus species group, with description of two new species (Rodentia, Muridae, Sigmodontinae)". Arquivos do Museu Nacional, Rio de Janeiro. 60: 285–294.
Oryzomys scotti	Rodentia	Langguth & Bonvicino	2002	Brazil	Langguth, A.; Bonvicino, C.R. (2002). "The Oryzomys subflavus species group, with description of two new species (Rodentia, Muridae, Sigmodontinae)". Arquivos do Museu Nacional, Rio de Janeiro. 60: 285–294.
Oxymycterus josei	Rodentia	Hoffman, Lessa & Smith	2002	Uruguay	Hoffmann, F.G.; Lessa, E.P.; Smith, M.F. (2002). "Systematics of Oxymycterus with description of a new species from Uruguay". Journal of Mammalogy. 83 (2): 408–420. doi:10.1644/1545-1542(2002)083<0408:soowdo>2.0.co;2. S2CID 85992544.
Phyllomys pattoni	Rodentia	Emmons, Leite, Kock & Costa	2002	Brazil (Bahia, Espirito Santo, Minas Gerais, Paraiba, Pernambuco, Rio de Janeiro, São Paulo)	Emmons, L.H., Leite, Y.L.R., Kock, D. & Costa, L.P. 2002. A Review of the Named Forms of Phyllomys (Rodentia: Echimyidae) with the Description of a New Species from Coastal Brazil. American Museum Novitates 3380:1–40.
Plecotus sardus	Chiroptera	Mucedda, Kiefer, Pidinchedda & Veith	2002	Italy	Mucedda, M., Kiefer, A., Pidinchedda, E. & Veith, M. 2002. A new species of long-eared bat (Chiroptera, Vespertilionidae) from Sardinia (Italy). Acta Chiropterologica 4(2):121–135.
Pteralopex taki	Chiroptera	Parnaby	2002	Solomon Islands	Parnaby, H.E. 2002. A taxonomic review of the genus Pteralopex (Chiroptera: Pteropodidae), the monkey-faced bats of the south-western Pacific. Australian Mammalogy 23:145–162.
Rhinolophus sakejiensis	Chiroptera	Cotterill	2002	Zambia	Cotterill, F.P.D. 2002. A new species of horseshoe bat (Microchiroptera: Rhinolophidae) from south-central Africa: with comments on its affinities and evolution, and the characterization of rhinolophid species. Journal of Zoology 256 2):165–179.
Rhinolophus ziama	Chiroptera	Fahr, Vierhaus, Hutterer & Kock	2002	Guinea, Liberia	Fahr, J., Vierhaus, H., Hutterer, R. & Kock, D. 2002. A revision of the Rhinolophus maclaudi species group with the description of a new species from West Africa (Chiroptera: Rhinolophidae). Myotis 40:95–126.
Sommeromys macrorhinos	Rodentia	Musser & Durden	2002	Sulawesi	Musser, G.G.; Durden, L.A. (2002). "Sulawesi rodents: description of a new genus and species of Murinae (Muridae, Rodentia) and its parasitic new species of sucking louse (Insecta, Anoplura)". American Museum Novitates (3368): 1–50. doi:10.1206/0003-0082(2002)368<0001:srdoan>2.0.co;2. S2CID 53408447.
Thomasomys onkiro	Rodentia	Luna & Pacheco	2002	Peru	Luna, L.; Pacheco, V. (2002). "A new species of Thomasomys (Muridae: Sigmodontinae) from the Andes of southeastern Peru". Journal of Mammalogy. 83 (3): 834–842. doi:10.1644/1545-1542(2002)083<0834:ansotm>2.0.co;2.
Trichosurus cunninghami	Diprotodontia	Lindenmayer, Dubach & Viggers	2002	Australia (New South Wales, Victoria)	Lindenmayer, D.B., Dubach, J. & Viggers, K.L. 2002. Geographic dimorphism in the mountain brushtail possum (Trichosurus caninus): The case for a new species". Australian Journal of Zoology 50(4):369.
Trinomys mirapitanga	Rodentia	Lara, Patton & Hingst-Zaher	2002	Brazil (Bahia)	Lara, M., Patton, J.L. & Hingst-Zaher, E. 2002. Trinomys mirapitanga, a new species of spiny rat (Rodentia: Echimyidae) from the Brazilian Atlantic Forest. Mammalian Biology – Zeitschrift für Säugetierkunde 67(4):233–242.
Carollia manu	Chiroptera	Pacheco, Solari & Velazco	2004	Bolivia, Peru	Pacheco, V., Solari, S. & Velazco, P.M. 2004. A New Species of Carollia (Chiroptera: Phyllostomidae) from the Andes of Peru and Bolivia. Occasional Papers, Museum of Texas Tech University 236: 1–15.
Crocidura kegoensis	Eulipotyphla	Lunde, Musser & Ziegler	2004	Vietnam	Lunde, D.P., Musser, G.G. & Ziegler, T. 2004. Description of a new species of Crocidura (Soricomorpha: Soricidae, Crocidurinae) from Ke Go Nature Reserve, Vietnam. Mammal Study 29: 27–36.
Lophostoma aequatorialis	Chiroptera	Baker, Fonseca, Parish, Phillips & Hoffmann	2004	Ecuador	Baker, R.J., Fonseca, R.M., Parish, D.A., Phillips, C.J. & Hoffmann, F.G. 2004. New Bat of the Genus Lophostoma (Phyllostomidae: Phyllostominae) from Northwestern Ecuador. Occasional Papers, Museum of Texas Tech University 232: 1–16.
Lophostoma yasuni	Chiroptera	Fonseca & Pinto	2004	Ecuador	Fonseca, R.M. & Pinto, C.M. 2004. A New Lophostoma (Chiroptera: Phyllostomidae: Phyllostominae) from the Amazonia of Ecuador. Occasional Papers, Museum of Texas Tech University 242: 9.
Marmosops creightoni	Didelphimorphia	Voss, Tarifa, Yensen	2004	Bolivia	Voss, R.S., Tarifa, T. & Yensen, E. 2004. An Introduction to Marmosops (Marsupialia: Didelphidae), with the Description of a New Species from Bolivia and Notes on the Taxonomy and Distribution of Other Bolivian Forms. American Museum Novitates 3466: 1–40.
Microgale jenkinsae	Afrosoricida	Goodman & Soarimalala	2004	Madagascar	Goodman, S.M. & Soarimalala, V. 2004. A New Species Of Microgale (Lipotyphla: Tenrecidae: Oryzorictinae) From The Foret Des Mikea Of Southwestern Madagascar. Proceedings of the Biological Society of Washington 117: 251–265.
Reithrodontomys bakeri	Rodentia	Bradley, Mendez-Harclerode, Hamilton & Ceballos	2004	Mexico (Guerrero)	Bradley, R.D., Mendez-Harclerode, F., Hamilton, M.J. & Ceballos, G. 2004. A New Species of Reithrodontomys from Guerrero, Mexico. Occasional Papers, Museum of Texas Tech University 231: 1–12.
Spilocuscus wilsoni	Diprotodontia	Helgen & Flannery	2004	Indonesia (Biak, Supiori)	Helgen, K.M. & Flannery, T.F. 2004. Notes on the phalangerid marsupial genus Spilocuscus, with description of a new species from Papua. Journal of Mammalogy 85: 825–833.
Isothrix barbarabrownae	Rodentia	Patterson & Velazco	2006	Peru (Cuzco)	Patterson, B.D. & P.M. Velazco. 2006. A distinctive new cloud-forest rodent (Hystricognathi: Echimyidae) from the Manu Biosphere Reserve, Peru. Mastozoología Neotropical 13:175–191.
Aotus jorgehernandezi	Primates	Defler & Bueno	2007	Colombia	Defler, T.R. & Bueno, M.L. 2007. Aotus diversity and the species problem. Primate Conservation 22.
Avahi betsileo	Primates	Andriantompohavana, Lei, Zaonarivelo, Engberg, Nalanirina, McGuire, Shore, Andrianasolo, Herringto, Brenneman & Louis, Jr.	2007	Madagascar	Andriantompohavana, R., Lei, R., Zaonarivelo, J.R., Engberg, S.E., Nalanirina, G., McGuire, S.M., Shore, G.D., Andrianasolo, J., Herrington, K., Brenneman, R.A. & Louis, E.A., Jr. 2007. Molecular phylogeny and taxonomic revision of the woolly lemurs, genus Avahi (Primates: Lemuriformes). Special Publications of the Museum of Texas Tech University 51:1–59.
Barbastella beijingensis	Chiroptera	J.-S. Zhang, Han, Jones, Lin, J.-P. Zhang, Zhu, Huang & S.-Y. Zhang	2007	China	Zhang, J.-S., Han, N.-J., Jones, G., Lin, L.-K., Zhang, J.-P., Zhu, G.-J., Huang, D.-W. & Zhang, S.-Y. 2007. A new species of Barbastella (Chiroptera: Vespertilionidae) from North China. Journal of Mammalogy 88(6):1393–1403.
Crocidura hikmiya	Eulipotyphla	S. Meegaskumbura, M. Meegaskumbura, Pethiyagoda, Manamendra-Arachchi & Schneider	2007	Sri Lanka	Meegaskumbura, S., Meegaskumbura, M., Pethiyagoda, R., Manamendra-Arachchi, K. & Schneider, C.J. 2007. Crocidura hikmiya, a new shrew (Mammalia: Soricomorpha: Soricidae) from Sri Lanka. Zootaxa 1665:19–30.
Crocidura sokolovi	Eulipotyphla	Jenkins, Abramov, Rozhnov & Makarova	2007	Vietnam	Jenkins, P.D., Abramov, A.V., Rozhnov, V.V. & Makarova, O.V. 2007. Description of two new species of white-toothed shrews belonging to the genus Crocidura (Soricomorpha: Soricidae) from Ngoc Linh Mountain, Vietnam. Zootaxa 1589:57–68.
Crocidura zaitsevi	Eulipotyphla	Jenkins, Abramov, Rozhnov & Makarova	2007	Vietnam	Jenkins, P.D., Abramov, A.V., Rozhnov, V.V. & Makarova, O.V. 2007. Description of two new species of white-toothed shrews belonging to the genus Crocidura (Soricomorpha: Soricidae) from Ngoc Linh Mountain, Vietnam. Zootaxa 1589:57–68.
Dyacopterus rickarti	Chiroptera	Helgen, Kock, Gomez & Ingle	2007		Helgen, K.M., Kock, D., Gomez, R.K.C.S., Ingle, N.R. & Sinaga, M.H. 2007. Taxonomy and natural history of the southeast Asian fruit-bat genus Dyacopterus. Journal of Mammalogy 88(2):302–318.
Eliurus danieli	Rodentia	Carleton & Goodman	2007	Madagascar	Carleton, M.D. & Goodman, S.M. 2007. A new species of the Eliurus majori complex (Rodentia: Muroidea: Nesomyidae) from south-central Madagascar, with remarks on emergent species groupings in the genus Eliurus. American Museum Novitates 3547:1–21.
Hipposideros boeadii	Chiroptera	Bates, Rossiter, Suyanto & Kingston	2007	Indonesia (Sulawesi)	Bates, P.J.J., Rossiter, S.J., Suyanto, A. & Kingston, T. 2007. A new species of Hipposideros (Chiroptera: Hipposideridae) from Sulawesi. Acta Chiropterologica 9(1):13–26.
Juliomys ossitenuis	Rodentia	Costa, Pavan, Leite & Fagundas	2007	Brazil (Espirito Santo, São Paulo)	Costa, L.P., Pavan, S.E., Leite, Y.L.R. & Fagundes, V. 2007. A new species of Juliomys (Mammalia: Rodentia: Cricetidae) from the Atlantic forest of southeastern Brazil. Zootaxa 1463:21–37.
Kerivoula krauensis	Chiroptera	Francis, Kingston & Zubaid	2007	Malaysia (Peninsular)	Francis, C.M., Kingston, T. & Zubaid, A. 2007. A new species of Kerivoula (Chiroptera: Vespertilionidae) from peninsular Malaysia. Acta Chiropterologica 9(1):1–12.
Kerivoula titania	Chiroptera	Bates, Struebig, Hayes, Furey, Mya, Vu, Pham, Nguyen, Harrison, Francis & Csorba	2007	Cambodia, Laos, Myanmar, Thailand, Vietnam	Bates, P.J.J., Struebig, M.J., Hayes, B.D., Furey, N.M., Mya, K.M., Vu D.T., Pham D.T., Nguyen T.S., Harrison, D.L., Francis, C.M. & Csorba, G. 2007. A new species of Kerivoula (Chiroptera: Vespertilionidae) from Southeast Asia. Acta Chiropterologica 9(2):323–337.
Lepilemur manasamody	Primates	Craul, Zimmermann, Rasoloharijaona, Randrianambinina & Radespiel	2007	Madagascar	Craul, M., Zimmermann, E., Rasolharijaona, S., Randrianambinina, B. & Radespiel, U. 2007. Unexpected species diversity of Malagasy primates (Lepilemur spp.) in the same biogeographical zone: a morphological and molecular approach with the description of two new species. BMC Evolutionary Biology 7:83;15 pp.
Lepilemur otto	Primates	Craul, Zimmermann, Rasoloharijaona, Randrianambinina & Radespiel	2007	Madagascar	Craul, M., Zimmermann, E., Rasolharijaona, S., Randrianambinina, B. & Radespiel, U. 2007. Unexpected species diversity of Malagasy primates (Lepilemur spp.) in the same biogeographical zone: a morphological and molecular approach with the description of two new species. BMC Evolutionary Biology 7:83;15 pp.
Lonchophylla fornicata	Chiroptera	Woodman	2007	Colombia, Ecuador	Woodman, N. 2007. A new species of nectar-feeding bat, genus Lonchophylla, from western Colombia and western Ecuador (Mammalia: Chiroptera: Phyllostomidae). Proceedings of the Biological Society of Washington 120(3):340–358.
Lophuromys chercherensis	Rodentia	Lavrenchenko, W.N. Verheyen, E. Verheyen, Hulselmans & Leirs	2007		Lavrenchenko, L.A., Verheyen, W.N., Verheyen, E., Hulselmans, J. & Leirs, H. 2007. Morphometric and genetic study of Ethiopian Lophuromys flavopunctatus Thomas, 1888 species complex with description of three new 70-chromosomal species (Muridae, Rodentia). Bulletin van het Koninklijk Belgisch Instituut voor Natuurwetenschappen, Biologie 77:77–117.
Lophuromys kilonzoi	Rodentia	W.N. Verheyen, Hulselmans, Dierckx, Mulungu, Leirs, Corti & E. Verheyen	2007		Verheyen, W.N., Hulselmans, J.L.J., Dierckx, T., Mulungu, L., Leirs, H., Corti, M. & Verheyen, E. 2007. The characterization of the Kilimanjaro Lophuromys aquilus True 1892 population and the description of five new Lophuromys species (Rodentia, Muridae). Bulletin van het Koninklijk Belgisch Instituut voor Natuurwetenschappen 77:23–75.
Lophuromys machangui	Rodentia	W.N. Verheyen, Hulselmans, Dierckx, Mulungu, Leirs, Corti & E. Verheyen	2007		Verheyen, W.N., Hulselmans, J.L.J., Dierckx, T., Mulungu, L., Leirs, H., Corti, M. & Verheyen, E. 2007. The characterization of the Kilimanjaro Lophuromys aquilus True 1892 population and the description of five new Lophuromys species (Rodentia, Muridae). Bulletin van het Koninklijk Belgisch Instituut voor Natuurwetenschappen 77:23–75.
Lophuromys makundii	Rodentia	W.N. Verheyen, Hulselmans, Dierckx, Mulungu, Leirs, Corti & E. Verheyen	2007		Verheyen, W.N., Hulselmans, J.L.J., Dierckx, T., Mulungu, L., Leirs, H., Corti, M. & Verheyen, E. 2007. The characterization of the Kilimanjaro Lophuromys aquilus True 1892 population and the description of five new Lophuromys species (Rodentia, Muridae). Bulletin van het Koninklijk Belgisch Instituut voor Natuurwetenschappen 77:23–75.
Lophuromys menageshae	Rodentia	Lavrenchenko, W.N. Verheyen, E. Verheyen, Hulselmans & Leirs	2007		Lavrenchenko, L.A., Verheyen, W.N., Verheyen, E., Hulselmans, J. & Leirs, H. 2007. Morphometric and genetic study of Ethiopian Lophuromys flavopunctatus Thomas, 1888 species complex with description of three new 70-chromosomal species (Muridae, Rodentia). Bulletin van het Koninklijk Belgisch Instituut voor Natuurwetenschappen, Biologie 77:77–117.
Lophuromys pseudosikapusi	Rodentia	Lavrenchenko, W.N. Verheyen, E. Verheyen, Hulselmans & Leirs	2007		Lavrenchenko, L.A., Verheyen, W.N., Verheyen, E., Hulselmans, J. & Leirs, H. 2007. Morphometric and genetic study of Ethiopian Lophuromys flavopunctatus Thomas, 1888 species complex with description of three new 70-chromosomal species (Muridae, Rodentia). Bulletin van het Koninklijk Belgisch Instituut voor Natuurwetenschappen, Biologie 77:77–117.
Lophuromys sabunii	Rodentia	W.N. Verheyen, Hulselmans, Dierckx, Mulungu, Leirs, Corti & E. Verheyen	2007		Verheyen, W.N., Hulselmans, J.L.J., Dierckx, T., Mulungu, L., Leirs, H., Corti, M. & Verheyen, E. 2007. The characterization of the Kilimanjaro Lophuromys aquilus True 1892 population and the description of five new Lophuromys species (Rodentia, Muridae). Bulletin van het Koninklijk Belgisch Instituut voor Natuurwetenschappen 77:23–75.
Lophuromys stanleyi	Rodentia	W.N. Verheyen, Hulselmans, Dierckx, Mulungu, Leirs, Corti & E. Verheyen	2007		Verheyen, W.N., Hulselmans, J.L.J., Dierckx, T., Mulungu, L., Leirs, H., Corti, M. & Verheyen, E. 2007. The characterization of the Kilimanjaro Lophuromys aquilus True 1892 population and the description of five new Lophuromys species (Rodentia, Muridae). Bulletin van het Koninklijk Belgisch Instituut voor Natuurwetenschappen 77:23–75.
Microcebus bongolavensis	Primates	Olivieri, Zimmermann, Randrianambinina, Rasoloharijaona, Rakotondravony, Guschanski & Radespiel	2007	Madagascar	Olivieri, G., Zimmermann, E., Randrianambinina, B., Rasoloharijaona, B., Rakotondravony, D., Guschanski, K. & Radespiel, U. 2007. The ever-increasing diversity in mouse lemurs: Three new species in north and northwestern Madagascar. Molecular Phylogeny and Evolution 43:309–327.
Microcebus danfossi	Primates	Olivieri, Zimmermann, Randrianambinina, Rasoloharijaona, Rakotondravony, Guschanski & Radespiel	2007	Madagascar	Olivieri, G., Zimmermann, E., Randrianambinina, B., Rasoloharijaona, B., Rakotondravony, D., Guschanski, K. & Radespiel, U. 2007. The ever-increasing diversity in mouse lemurs: Three new species in north and northwestern Madagascar. Molecular Phylogeny and Evolution 43:309–327.
Microcebus lokobensis	Primates	Olivieri, Zimmermann, Randrianambinina, Rasoloharijaona, Rakotondravony, Guschanski & Radespiel	2007	Madagascar	Olivieri, G., Zimmermann, E., Randrianambinina, B., Rasoloharijaona, B., Rakotondravony, D., Guschanski, K. & Radespiel, U. 2007. The ever-increasing diversity in mouse lemurs: Three new species in north and northwestern Madagascar. Molecular Phylogeny and Evolution 43:309–327.
Micronycteris giovanniae	Chiroptera	Baker & Fonseca	2007	Ecuador	Fonseca, R.M., Hoofer, S.R, Porter, C.A., Cline, C.A., Parish, D.A., Hoffmann, F.G. & Baker, R.J. 2007. Morphological and molecular variation within little big-eared bats of the genus Micronycteris (Phyllostomidae: Micronycterinae) from San Lorenzo, Ecuador. pp. 721–746 in Kelt, D.A., Lessa, E.P., Salazar-Bravo, J. & Patton, J.L. (eds.). 2007. The Quintessential Naturalist: Honoring the Life and Legacy of Oliver P. Pearson. University of California Publications in Zoology 134:1–981.
Miniopterus sororculus	Chiroptera	Goodman, Ryan, Maminirina, Fahr, Christidis & Appleton	2007	Madagascar	Goodman, S.M., Ryan, K.E., Maminirina, C.P. Fahr, J., Christidis, L. & Appleton, B. 2007. Specific status of populations on Madagascar referred to Miniopterus fraterculus (Chiroptera: Vespertillionidae), with description of a new species. Journal of Mammalogy 88:1216–1229.
Mogera kanoana	Eulipotyphla	Kawada, Shinohara, Kobayashi, Harada, Oda & Lin	2007	Taiwan	Kawada, S.-i., Shinohara, A., Kobayashi, S., Harada, M., Oda, S.-i. & Lin, L.-K. 2007. Revision of the mole genus Mogera (Mammalia: Lipotyphla: Talpidae) from Taiwan. Systematics and Biodiversity 5(2):223–240.
Monodelphis handleyi	Didelphimorphia	Solari	2007	Peru	Solari, S. 2007. New species of Monodelphis (Didelphimorphia: Didelphidae) from Peru, with notes on M. adusta (Thomas, 1897). Journal of Mammalogy 88(2):319–329.
Murina tiensa	Chiroptera	Csorba, Vu, Bates & Furey	2007	Vietnam	Csorba, G., Vu D.T., Bates, P.J.J. & Furey, N.M. 2007. Description of a new species of Murina from Vietnam (Chiroptera: Vespertilionidae: Murininae). Occasional Papers, Museum of Texas Tech University 268:1–10.
Myzopoda schliemanni	Chiroptera	Goodman, Rakotrondraparany & Kofoky	2007	Madagascar	Goodman, S.M., Rakotondraparany, F. & Kofoky, A. 2007. The description of a new species of Myzopoda (Myzopodidae: Chiroptera) from western Madagascar. Mammalian Biology 72(2):65–81.
Pecari maximus	Artiodactyla	Van Roosmalen, Frenz, Van Hooft, De Iongh & Leirs	2007	Brazil (Amazonas)	Roosmalen, M.G.M. van, Frenz, L., Hooft, P. van, Iongh, H.H. de & Leirs, H. 2007. A new species of living peccary (Mammalia: Tayassuidae) from the Brazilian Amazon. Bonner zoologische Beiträge 55(2):105–112.
Petaurista mechukaensis	Rodentia	Choudhury	2007	India (NE India)	Choudhury, A.U. (2007). A new flying squirrel of the genus Petaurista Link from Arunachal Pradesh in north-east India. The Newsletter & Journal of the Rhino Foundation for nat. in NE India 7: 26–34, plates.
Phyllotis anitae	Chiroptera	Jayat, D'Elía, Pardiñas & Namen	2007	Argentina	Jayat, J.P., D'Elía, G., Pardiñas, U.F.J. & Namen, J.G. 2007. A new species of Phyllotis (Rodentia, Cricetidae, Sigmodontinae) from the upper montane forest of the Yungas of northwestern Argentina. pp. 775–798 in Kelt, D.A., Lessa, E.P., Salazar-Bravo, J. & Patton, J.L. (eds.). 2007. The Quintessential Naturalist: Honoring the Life and Legacy of Oliver P. Pearson. University of California Publications in Zoology 134:1–981.
Proedromys liangshanensis	Rodentia	Liu, Sun, Zeng & Zhao	2007	China (Sichuan)	Liu, S., Sun, Z., Zeng, Z. & Zhao, E. 2007. A new vole (Cricetidae: Arvicolinae: Proedromys) from the Liangshan Mountains of Sichuan Province, China. Journal of Mammalogy 88:1170–1178.
Rhynchomys banahao	Rodentia	Balete, Rickart, Rosell-Ambal, Jansa & Heaney	2007	Philippines (Luzon)	Balete, D.S., Rickart, E.A., Rosell-Ambal, R.G.B., Jansa, S. & Heaney, L.R. 2007. Descriptions of two new species of Rhynchomys Thomas (Rodentia: Muridae: Murinae) from Luzon Island, Philippines. Journal of Mammalogy 88(2):287–301.
Rhynchomys tapulao	Rodentia	Balete, Rickart, Rosell-Ambal, Jansa & Heaney	2007	Philippines (Luzon)	Balete, D.S., Rickart, E.A., Rosell-Ambal, R.G.B., Jansa, S. & Heaney, L.R. 2007. Descriptions of two new species of Rhynchomys Thomas (Rodentia: Muridae: Murinae) from Luzon Island, Philippines. Journal of Mammalogy 88(2):287–301.
Sorex rohweri	Eulipotyphla	Rausch, Feagin & Rausch	2007	Canada (British Columbia), USA (Washington)	Rausch, R.L., Feagin, J.E. & Rausch, V.R. 2007. Sorex rohweri sp. nov. (Mammalia, Soricidae) from northwestern North America. Mammalian Biology 72(2):93–105.
Spermophilus taurensis	Rodentia	Gündüz, Jaarola, Tez, Yeniyurt, Polly & Searle	2007	Turkey	Gündüz, İ., Jaarola, M., Tez, C., Yeniyurt, C., Polly, P.D. & Searle, J.B. 2007. Multigenic and morphometric differentiation of ground squirrels (Spermophilus, Scuiridae, Rodentia) in Turkey, with a description of a new species. Molecular Phylogenetics and Evolution 43:916–935.
Spermophilus torosensis	Rodentia	Özkurt, Sözen, Yiğit, Kandemir, R. Çolak, Gharkheloo & E. Çolak	2007	Turkey	Özkurt, S.Ö., Sözen, M., Yiğit, N., Kandemir, I., Çolak, R., Gharkheloo, M.M. & Çolak, E. 2007. Taxonomic status of the genus Spermophilus (Mammalia: Rodentia) in Turkey and Iran with description of a new species. Zootaxa 1529:1–15.
Thomasomys andersoni	Rodentia	Salazar-Bravo & Yates	2007	Bolivia	Salazar-Bravo, J. & Yates, T.L. 2007. A new species of Thomasomys (Cricetidae: Sigmodontinae) from central Bolivia. pp. 747–774 in Kelt, D.A., Lessa, E.P., Salazar-Bravo, J. & Patton, J.L. (eds.). 2007. The Quintessential Naturalist: Honoring the Life and Legacy of Oliver P. Pearson. University of California Publications in Zoology 134:1–981.
Crocidura phuquocensis	Eulipotyphla	Abramov, Jenkins, Rozhnov & Kalinin	2008	Vietnam	Abramov, A.V., Jenkins, P.D., Rozhnov, V.V. & Kalinin, A.A. 2008. Description of a new species of Crocidura (Soricomorpha: Soricidae) from the island of Phu Quoc, Vietnam. Mammalia 72:269–272.
Desmalopex microleucoptera	Chiroptera	Esselstyn, Garcia, Saulog & Heaney	2008	Philippines (Mindoro)	Esselstyn, J.A., Garcia, H.J.D., Saulog, M.G. & Heaney, L.R. 2008. A New Species of Desmalopex (Pteropodidae) from the Philippines, with a Phylogenetic Analysis of the Pteropodini. Journal of Mammalogy 89:815–825.
Elephantulus pilicaudus	Macroscelidea	Smit, Robinson, Watson & Jansen van Vuuren	2008	South Africa	Smit, H.A., Robinson, T.J., Watson, J. & Jansen van Vuuren, B. 2008. A new species of elephant-shrew (Afrotheria: Macroscelidea: Elephantulus) from South Africa. Journal of Mammalogy 89:1257–1268.
Lonchophylla orienticollina	Chiroptera	Dávalos & Corthals	2008	Colombia, Ecuador, Venezuela	Dávalos, L.M. & Corthals, A. 2008. A new species of Lonchophylla (Chiroptera: Phyllostomidae) from the eastern Andes of northwestern South America. American Museum Novitates 3635:1–16.
Miniopterus petersoni	Chiroptera	Goodman, Bradman, Maminirina, Ryan, Christidis & Appleton	2008	Madagascar	Goodman, S., Bradman, H., Maminirina, C., Ryan, K., Christidis, L. & Appleton, B. 2008. A new species of Miniopterus (Chiroptera: Miniopteridae) from lowland southeastern Madagascar. Mammalian Biology 73:199–213.
Mops bakarii	Chiroptera	Stanley	2008	Tanzania	Stanley, W.T. 2008. A new species of Mops (Molossidae) from Pemba Island, Tanzania. Acta Chiropterologica 10:183–192.
Mormopterus eleryi	Chiroptera	Reardon & McKenzie	2008	Australia (South Australia)	Reardon, T., Adams, M., McKenzie, N. & Jenkins, P. 2008. A new species of Australian freetail bat Mormopterus eleryi sp. nov. (Chiroptera: Molossidae) and a taxonomic reappraisal of M. norfolkensis (Gray). Zootaxa 1875:1–31.
Mormopterus francoismoutoui	Chiroptera	Goodman, Jansen van Vuuren, Ratrimomanarivo, Probst & Bowie	2008	Reunion	Goodman, S.M., Jansen van Vuuren, B., Ratrimomanarivo, F., Probst, J.-M. & Bowie, R.C.K. 2008. Specific status of populations in the Mascarene Islands referred to Mormopterus acetabulosus (Chiroptera: Molossidae), with description of a new species. Journal of Mammalogy 89:1316–1327.
Murina harpioloides	Chiroptera	Kruskop & Eger	2008	Vietnam	Kruskop, S.V. & Eger, J.L. 2008. A new species of tube-nosed bat Murina (Vespertilionidae, Chiroptera) from Vietnam. Acta Chiropterologica 10:213–220.
Myosorex gnoskei	Eulipotyphla	Kerbis Peterhans, Hutterer, Kaliba & Mazibuko	2008	Malawi	Kerbis Peterhans, J.C., Hutterer, R., Kaliba, P. & Mazibuko, L. 2008. First record of Myosorex (Mammalia: Soricidae) from Malawi with description as a new species, Myosorex gnoskei. Journal of East African Natural History 97:19–32.
Myotis phanluongi	Chiroptera	Borisenko, Kruskop & Ivanova	2008	Vietnam	Borisenko, A.V., Kruskop, S.V. & Ivanova, N.Y. 2008. A new mouse-eared bat (Mammalia: Chiroptera: Vespertilionidae) from Vietnam. Russian Journal of Theriology 7:57–69.
Philander olrogi	Didelphimorphia	Flores, Barquez & Díaz	2008	Bolivia, Peru	Flores, D.A., Barquez, R.M. & Díaz, M.M. 2008. A new species of Philander Brisson, 1762 (Didelphimorphia, Didelphidae). Mammalian Biology 73:14–24.
Rhinolophus huananus	Chiroptera	Wu, Motokawa & Harada	2008	China (Guangdong, Guangxi, Jiangxi)	Wu, Y., Motokawa, M. & Harada, M. 2008. A New Species of Horseshoe Bat of the Genus Rhinolophus from China (Chiroptera: Rhinolophidae). Zoological Science 25:438–443.
Rhynchocyon udzungwensis	Macroscelidea	Rathbun & Rovero	2008	Tanzania	Rovero, F., Rathbun, G.B., Perkin, A., Jones, T., Ribble, D.O., Leonard, C., Mwakisoma, R.R. & Doggart, N. 2008. A new species of giant sengi or elephant-shrew (genus Rhynchocyon) highlights the exceptional biodiversity of the Udzungwa Mountains of Tanzania. Journal of Zoology 274:126–133.
Triaenops pauliani	Chiroptera	Goodman & Ranivo	2008	Seychelles	Goodman, S.M. & Ranivo, J. 2008. A new species of Triaenops (Mammalia, Chiroptera, Hipposideridae) from Aldabra Atoll, Picard Island (Seychelles). Zoosystema 30:681–693.
Tylonycteris pygmaea	Chiroptera	Feng, Li & Wang	2008	China (Yunnan)	Feng, Q., Li, S. & Wang, Y. 2008. A New Species of Bamboo Bat (Chiroptera: Vespertilionidae: Tylonycteris) from Southwestern China. Zoological Science 25:225–234.
Abrawayaomys chebezi	Rodentia	Pardiñas, Teta & D'Elía	2009	Argentina	Pardiñas, U.F.J., Teta, P. & D'Elía, G. 2009. Taxonomy and distribution of Abrawayaomys (Rodentia: Cricetidae), an Atlantic Forest endemic with the description of a new species. Zootaxa 2128:39–60.
Coccymys kirrhos	Rodentia	Musser & Lunde	2009	Papua New Guinea (New Guinea)	Musser, G.G. & Lunde, D.P. 2009. Systematic Reviews of New Guinea Coccymys and "Melomys" Albidens (Muridae, Murinae) with Descriptions of New Taxa. Bulletin of the American Museum of Natural History 329:1–139.
Crocidura annamitensis	Eulipotyphla	Jenkins, Lunde & Moncrieff	2009	Vietnam	Jenkins, P.D., Lunde, D.P. & Moncrieff, C.B. 2009. Chapter 10. Descriptions of New Species of Crocidura (Soricomorpha: Soricidae) from Mainland Southeast Asia, with Synopses of Previously Described Species and Remarks on Biogeography. Bulletin of the American Museum of Natural History 331:356–405.
Crocidura cranbrooki	Eulipotyphla	Lunde & Moncrieff	2009	Myanmar	Jenkins, P.D., Lunde, D.P. & Moncrieff, C.B. 2009. Chapter 10. Descriptions of New Species of Crocidura (Soricomorpha: Soricidae) from Mainland Southeast Asia, with Synopses of Previously Described Species and Remarks on Biogeography. Bulletin of the American Museum of Natural History 331:356–405.
Crocidura guy	Eulipotyphla	Jenkins, Lunde & Moncrieff	2009	Vietnam	Jenkins, P.D., Lunde, D.P. & Moncrieff, C.B. 2009. Chapter 10. Descriptions of New Species of Crocidura (Soricomorpha: Soricidae) from Mainland Southeast Asia, with Synopses of Previously Described Species and Remarks on Biogeography. Bulletin of the American Museum of Natural History 331:356–405.
Dendromus ruppi	Rodentia	Dieterlen	2009	South Sudan	Dieterlen, F. 2009. Climbing mice of the genus Dendromus (Nesomyidae, Dendromurinae) in Sudan and Ethiopia, with the description of a new species. Bonner zoologische Beiträge 56:185–200.
Eliurus carletoni	Rodentia	Goodman, Raheriarisena & Jansa	2009	Madagascar	Goodman, S.M., Raheriarisena, M. & Jansa, S.A. 2009. A new species of Eliurus Milne Edwards, 1885 (Rodentia: Nesomyinae) from the Réserve Spéciale d'Ankarana, northern Madagascar. Bonner zoologische Beiträge 56:133–149.
Eptesicus lobatus	Chiroptera	Zagorodniuk	2009	Ukraine (Luhansk)	Zagorodniuk I. 2009. Morphology of post-calcarial lobe in bats and its variation in Eptesicus "serotinus" (Mammalia). Visnyk of Lviv University, Biology Series 51:157–175.
Eumops wilsoni	Chiroptera	Baker, McDonough, Swier, Larsen, Carrera & Ammerman	2009	Ecuador, Peru	Baker, R.J., McDonough, M.M., Swier, V.J., Larsen, P.A., Carrera, J.P. & Ammerman, L.K. 2009. New Species of Bonneted Bat, GenusEumops(Chiroptera: Molossidae) from the Lowlands of Western Ecuador and Peru. Acta Chiropterologica 11:1–13.
Graphiurus walterverheyeni	Rodentia	Holden & Levine	2009	Congo (Dem.Rep.)	Holden, M.E. & Levine, R.S. 2009. Chapter 9. Systematic Revision of Sub-Saharan African Dormice (Rodentia: Gliridae: Graphiurus) Part II: Description of a New Species of Graphiurus from the Central Congo Basin, Including Morphological and Ecological Niche Comparisons with G. Crassicaudatus and G. Lorraineus. Bulletin of the American Museum of Natural History 331:314–355.
Heteromys catopterius	Rodentia	Anderson & Gutiérrez	2009	Venezuela	Anderson, R.P. & Gutiérrez, E.E. 2009. Taxonomy, Distribution, and Natural History of the Genus Heteromys (Rodentia: Heteromyidae) in Central and Eastern Venezuela, with the Description of a New Species from the Cordillera de la Costa. Bulletin of the American Museum of Natural History 331:33–93
Lagidium ahuacaense	Rodentia	Ledesma, Werner, Spotorno & Albuja	2009	Ecuador	Ledesma, K.J., Werner, F.A., Spotorno, A.E. & Albuja, L.H. 2009. A new species of mountain viscacha (Chinchillidae: Lagidium Meyen) from the Ecuadorean Andes. Zootaxa 2126:41–57.
Lepilemur hollandorum	Primates	Ramaromilanto, Lei, Engberg, Johnson, Sitzmann & Louis	2009	Madagascar	Ramaromilanto, B., Lei, R., Engberg, S.E., Johnson, S.E., Sitzmann, B.D. & Louis, E.E. 2009. Sportive lemur diversity at Mananara-Nord Biosphere Reserve, Madagascar. Occasional Papers, Museum of Texas Tech University 286:1–22.
Microgale grandidieri	Afrosoricida	Olson, Rakotomalala, Hildebrandt, Lanier, Raxworthy & Goodman	2009	Madagascar	Olson, L.E., Rakotomalala, Z., Hildebrandt, K.B.P., Lanier, H.C., Raxworthy, C.J. & Goodman, S.M. 2009. Phylogeography of Microgale brevicaudata (Tenrecidae) and description of a new species from western Madagascar. Journal of Mammalogy 90:1095–1110.
Miniopterus aelleni	Chiroptera	Goodman, Maminirina, Weyeneth, Bradman, Christidis, Ruedi & Appleton	2009	Comoros, Madagascar	Goodman, S.M., Maminirina, C.P., Weyeneth, N., Bradman, H.M., Christidis, L., Ruedi, M. & Appleton, B. 2009. The use of molecular and morphological characters to resolve the taxonomic identity of cryptic species: the case of Miniopterus manavi (Chiroptera, Miniopteridae). Zoologica Scripta 38:339–363.
Miniopterus brachytragos	Chiroptera	Goodman, Maminirina, Bradman, Christidis & Appleton	2009	Madagascar	Goodman, S.M., Maminirina, C.P., Bradman, H.M., Christidis & Appleton, B. 2009. The Use of Molecular Phylogenetic and Morphological Tools to Identify Cryptic and Paraphyletic Species: Examples from the Diminutive Long-fingered Bats (Chiroptera: Miniopteridae: Miniopterus) on Madagascar. American Museum Novitates 3669:1–34.
Miniopterus mahafaliensis	Chiroptera	Goodman, Maminirina, Bradman, Christidis & Appleton	2009	Madagascar	Goodman, S.M., Maminirina, C.P., Bradman, H.M., Christidis & Appleton, B. 2009. The Use of Molecular Phylogenetic and Morphological Tools to Identify Cryptic and Paraphyletic Species: Examples from the Diminutive Long-fingered Bats (Chiroptera: Miniopteridae: Miniopterus) on Madagascar. American Museum Novitates 3669:1–34.
Mirzamys louiseae	Rodentia	K.Helgen & L.Helgen	2009	Papua New Guinea (New Guinea)	Helgen, K.M. & Helgen, L.E. 2009. Chapter 8. Biodiversity and Biogeography of the Moss-mice of New Guinea: A Taxonomic Revision of Pseudohydromys (Muridae: Murinae). Bulletin of the American Museum of Natural History 331:230–313.
Mirzamys norahae	Rodentia	K.Helgen & L.Helgen	2009	Papua New Guinea (New Guinea)	Helgen, K.M. & Helgen, L.E. 2009. Chapter 8. Biodiversity and Biogeography of the Moss-mice of New Guinea: A Taxonomic Revision of Pseudohydromys (Muridae: Murinae). Bulletin of the American Museum of Natural History 331:230–313.
Murina bicolor	Chiroptera	Kuo, Fang, Csorba & Lee	2009	Taiwan	Kuo, H.-C., Fang, Y.-P., Csorba, G. & Lee, L.-L. 2009. Three New Species of Murina (Chiroptera: Vespertilionidae) from Taiwan. Journal of Mammalogy 90:980–991.
Murina eleryi	Chiroptera	Furey, Thong, Bates & Csorba	2009	Vietnam	Furey, N.M., Thong, V.D., Bates, P.J.J. & Csorba, G. 2009. Description of a New Species Belonging to the Murina 'suilla-group' (Chiroptera: Vespertilionidae: Murininae) from North Vietnam. Acta Chiropterologica 11;225–236.
Murina gracilis	Chiroptera	Kuo, Fang, Csorba & Lee	2009	Taiwan	Kuo, H.-C., Fang, Y.-P., Csorba, G. & Lee, L.-L. 2009. Three New Species of Murina (Chiroptera: Vespertilionidae) from Taiwan. Journal of Mammalogy 90:980–991.
Murina recondita	Chiroptera	Kuo, Fang, Csorba & Lee	2009	Taiwan	Kuo, H.-C., Fang, Y.-P., Csorba, G. & Lee, L.-L. 2009. Three New Species of Murina (Chiroptera: Vespertilionidae) from Taiwan. Journal of Mammalogy 90:980–991.
Musseromys gulantang	Rodentia	Heaney, Balete, Rickart, Veluz & Jansa	2009	Philippines (Luzon)	Heaney, L.R., Balete, D.S., Rickart, E.A., Veluz, M.J. & Jansa, S.A. 2009. Chapter 7. A New Genus and Species of Small 'Tree-Mouse' (Rodentia, Muridae) Related to the Philippine Giant Cloud Rats. Bulletin of the American Museum of Natural History 331:205–229.
Nyctophilus corbeni	Chiroptera	Parnaby	2009	Australia (New South Wales, Queensland, South Australia, Victoria)	Parnaby, H.E. 2009. A taxonomic review of Australian Greater Long-eared Bats previously known as Nyctophilus timoriensis (Chiroptera: Vespertilionidae) and some associated taxa. Australian Zoologist 35:39–81.
Nyctophilus shirleyae	Chiroptera	Parnaby	2009	Papua New Guinea (New Guinea)	Parnaby, H.E. 2009. A taxonomic review of Australian Greater Long-eared Bats previously known as Nyctophilus timoriensis (Chiroptera: Vespertilionidae) and some associated taxa. Australian Zoologist 35:39–81.
Oecomys sydandersoni	Rodentia	Carleton, Emmons & Musser	2009	Bolivia	Carleton, M.D., Emmons, L.H. & Musser, G.G. 2009. "A new species of the rodent genus Oecomys (Cricetidae: Sigmodontinae: Oryzomyini) from eastern Bolivia, with emended definitions of O. concolor (Wagner) and O. mamorae (Thomas). American Museum Novitates 3661:1–32.
Paradoxurus stenocephalus	Carnivora	Groves, Rajapaksha & Manemandra-Arachchi	2009	Sri Lanka	Groves, C.P., Rajapaksha, C. & Manemandra-Arachchi, K. 2009. The taxonomy of the endemic golden palm civet of Sri Lanka. Zoological Journal of the Linnean Society 155:238–251.
Petaurista mishmiensis	Rodentia	Choudhury	2009	India (NE India)	Choudhury, A.U. (2009). One more new flying squirrel of the genus Petaurista Link, 1795 from Arunachal Pradesh in north-east India. The Newsletter & Journal of the Rhino Foundation for nat. in NE India 8: 26–34, plates.
Platyrrhinus nitelinea	Chiroptera	Velazco & Gardner	2009	Colombia, Ecuador	Velazco, P.M. & Gardner, A.L. 2009. A new species of Platyrrhinus (Chiroptera: Phyllostomidae) from western Colombia and Ecuador, with emended diagnoses of P. Aquilus, P. Dorsalis, and P. Umbratus. Proceedings of the Biological Society of Washington 122:249–281.
Pseudohydromys berniceae	Rodentia	K.Helgen & L.Helgen	2009	Papua New Guinea (New Guinea)	Helgen, K.M. & Helgen, L.E. 2009. Chapter 8. Biodiversity and Biogeography of the Moss-mice of New Guinea: A Taxonomic Revision of Pseudohydromys (Muridae: Murinae). Bulletin of the American Museum of Natural History 331:230–313.
Pseudohydromys carlae	Rodentia	K.Helgen & L.Helgen	2009	Papua New Guinea (New Guinea)	Helgen, K.M. & Helgen, L.E. 2009. Chapter 8. Biodiversity and Biogeography of the Moss-mice of New Guinea: A Taxonomic Revision of Pseudohydromys (Muridae: Murinae). Bulletin of the American Museum of Natural History 331:230–313.
Pseudohydromys eleanorae	Rodentia	K.Helgen & L.Helgen	2009	Papua New Guinea (New Guinea)	Helgen, K.M. & Helgen, L.E. 2009. Chapter 8. Biodiversity and Biogeography of the Moss-mice of New Guinea: A Taxonomic Revision of Pseudohydromys (Muridae: Murinae). Bulletin of the American Museum of Natural History 331:230–313.
Pseudohydromys patriciae	Rodentia	K.Helgen & L.Helgen	2009	Indonesia (New Guinea)	Helgen, K.M. & Helgen, L.E. 2009. Chapter 8. Biodiversity and Biogeography of the Moss-mice of New Guinea: A Taxonomic Revision of Pseudohydromys (Muridae: Murinae). Bulletin of the American Museum of Natural History 331:230–313.
Pseudohydromys pumehanae	Rodentia	K.Helgen & L.Helgen	2009	Papua New Guinea (New Guinea)	Helgen, K.M. & Helgen, L.E. 2009. Chapter 8. Biodiversity and Biogeography of the Moss-mice of New Guinea: A Taxonomic Revision of Pseudohydromys (Muridae: Murinae). Bulletin of the American Museum of Natural History 331:230–313.
Pseudohydromys sandrae	Rodentia	K.Helgen & L.Helgen	2009	Papua New Guinea (New Guinea)	Helgen, K.M. & Helgen, L.E. 2009. Chapter 8. Biodiversity and Biogeography of the Moss-mice of New Guinea: A Taxonomic Revision of Pseudohydromys (Muridae: Murinae). Bulletin of the American Museum of Natural History 331:230–313.
Reithrodontomys musseri	Rodentia	Gardner & Carleton	2009	Costa Rica	Gardner, A.L. & Carleton, M.D. 2009. A new species of Reithrodontomys, subgenus Aporodon (Cricetidae: Neotominae), from the highlands of Costa Rica, with comments on Costa Rican and Panamanian Reithrodontomys. Bulletin of the American Museum of Natural History 331:157–182.
Rhinolophus thailandensis	Chiroptera	Wu, Harada & Motokawa	2009	Thailand	Wu, Y., Harada, M. & Motokawa, M, 2009. Taxonomy of Rhinolophus yunanensis Dobson, 1872 (Chiroptera: Rhinolophidae) with a Description of a New Species from Thailand. Acta Chiropterologica 11:237–246.
Rhinolophus xinanzhongguoensis	Chiroptera	Zhou, Guillén-Servant, Lim, Eger, Wang & Jiang	2009	China (Guizhou, Yunnan)	Zhou, Z.-M., Guillén-Servant, A., Lim, B.K., Eger, J.L., Wang, Y.-X. & Jiang, X.-L. 2009. A New Species from Southwestern China in the Afro-Palearctic Lineage of the Horseshoe Bats (Rhinolophus). Journal of Mammalogy 90:57–73.
Rhinopoma hadramauticum	Chiroptera	Benda, Reiter, Al-Jumaily, Nasher & Hulva	2009	Yemen	Benda, P., Reiter, A., Al-Jumaily, M., Nasher, A.K. & Hulva, P. 2009. A new species of mouse-tailed bat (Chiroptera: Rhinopomatidae: Rhinopoma) from Yemen. Journal of the National Museum (Prague), Natural History Series 177:53–68.
Suncus hututsi	Eulipotyphla	Kerbis Peterhans & Hutterer	2009	Burundi	Kerbis Peterhans, J.C. & Hutterer, R. 2009. The description of a new species of Suncus (Soricidae, Mammalia) from Central Africa. Bonner zoologische Monographien 55:141–150.
Surdisorex schlitteri	Eulipotyphla	Kerbis Peterhans, Stanley, Hutterer, Demos & Agwanda	2009	Kenya	Kerbis Peterhans, J., Stanley, W.T., Hutterer, R., Demos, T.C. & Agwanda, B. 2009. A new species of Surdisorex Thomas, 1906 (Mammalia, Soricidae) from western Kenya. Bonner zoologische Beiträge 56:175–183.
Sylvisorex akaibei	Eulipotyphla	Mukinzi, Hutterer & Barriere	2009	Congo (Dem.Rep.)	Mukinzi, I., Hutterer, R. & Barriere, P. 2009. A new species of Sylvisorex (Mammalia: Soricidae) from lowland forests north of Kisangani, Democratic Republic of Congo. Mammalia 73:130–134.
Sylvisorex corbeti	Eulipotyphla	Hutterer & Montermann	2009	Nigeria	Hutterer, R. & Montermann, C. 2009. A large new species of Sylvisorex (Mammalia: Soricidae) from Nigeria and the first record of Sylvisorex ollula from the country. Bonner zoologische Beiträge 56:201–208.
Sylvisorex silvanorum	Eulipotyphla	Hutterer, Riegert & Sedláček	2009	Cameroon	Hutterer, R., Riegert, J. & Sedláček, O. 2009. A tiny new species of Sylvisorex (Mammalia: Soricidae) from the Bamenda Highlands, Cameroon. Bonner zoologische Beiträge 56:151–157.
Triaenops menamena	Chiroptera	Goodman & Ranivo	2009	Madagascar	Goodman, S.M. & Ranivo, J. 2009. The geographical origin of the type specimens ofTriaenops rufusandT.humbloti(Chiroptera: Hipposideridae) reputed to be from Madagascar and the description of a replacement species name. Mammalia 73:47–55.
Triaenops parvus	Chiroptera	Benda & Vallo	2009	Yemen	Benda, P. & Vallo, P. 2009. Taxonomic revision of the genus Triaenops (Chiroptera: Hipposideridae) with description of a new species from southern Arabia and definitions of a new genus and tribe. Folia Zoologica 58-Monograph:1–45.
Akodon polopi	Rodentia	Jayat, Ortiz, Salazar-Bravo, Pardiñas & D'Elía	2010	Argentina (Cordoba)	Jayat, J.P., Ortiz, P.E., Salazar-Bravo, J., Pardiñas, U.F.J. & D'Elía, G. 2010. The Akodon boliviensis species group (Rodentia: Cricetidae: Sigmodontinae) in Argentina: species limits and distribution, with the description of a new entity. Zootaxa 2409:1–61
Anoura carishina	Chiroptera	Mantilla-Meluk & Baker	2010	Colombia	Mantilla-Meluk, H. & Baker, R.J. 2010. New species of Anoura (Chiroptera: Phyllostomidae) from Colombia, with systematic remarks and notes on the distribution of the A. geoffroyi complex. Occasional Papers, Museum of Texas Tech University 292:1–19
Callicebus caquetensis	Primates	Defler, Bueno & García	2010	Colombia	Defler, T.R., Bueno, M.L. & García, J. 2010. Callicebus caquetensis: A New and Critically Endangered Titi Monkey from Southern Caquetá, Colombia. Primate Conservation 25:1–9
Calomys cerqueirai	Rodentia	Bonvicino, de Oliveira & Gentile	2010	Brazil (Minas Gerais)	Bonvicino, C.R., de Oliveira, J.A. & Gentile, R. 2010. A new species of Calomys (Rodentia: Sigmodontinae) from Eastern Brazil. Zootaxa 2336:19–25
Chaerephon atsinanana	Chiroptera	Goodman, Buccas, Naidoo, Ratrimomanarivo, Taylor & Lamb	2010	Madagascar	Goodman, S.M., Buccas, W., Naidoo, T., Ratrimomanarivo, F., Taylor, P.J. & Lamb, J. 2010. Patterns of morphological and genetic variation in western Indian Ocean members of the Chaerephon 'pumilus' complex (Chiroptera: Molossidae), with the description of a new species from Madagascar. Zootaxa 2551:1–36
Chiroderma vizottoi	Chiroptera	Taddei & Lim	2010	Brazil (Piaui)	Taddei, V.A. & Lim, B.K. 2010. A new species of Chiroderma (Chiroptera, Phyllostomidae) from Northeastern Brazil. Brazilian Journal of Biology 70:381–386
Crocidura ninoyi	Eulipotyphla	Esselstyn & Goodman	2010	Philippines (Sibuyan)	Esselstyn, J.A. & Goodman, S.M. 2010. New species of shrew (Soricidae: Crocidura) from Sibuyan Island, Philippines. Journal of Mammalogy 91:1467–1472
Crocidura phanluongi	Eulipotyphla	Jenkins, Abramov, Rozhnov & Olsson	2010	Cambodia, Vietnam	Jenkins, P.D., Abramov, A.V., Rozhnov, V.V. & Olsson, A. 2010. A new species of Crocidura (Soricomorpha: Soricidae) from southern Vietnam and north-eastern Cambodia. Zootaxa 2345:60–68
Cryptotis lacertosus	Eulipotyphla	Woodman	2010	Guatemala	Woodman, N. 2010. Two new species of shrews (Soricidae) from the western highlands of Guatemala. Journal of Mammalogy 91:566–579
Cryptotis mam	Eulipotyphla	Woodman	2010	Guatemala	Woodman, N. 2010. Two new species of shrews (Soricidae) from the western highlands of Guatemala. Journal of Mammalogy 91:566–579
Hylomyscus pamfi	Rodentia	Nicolas, Olayemi, Wendelen & Colyn	2010	Benin, Nigeria	Nicolas, V., Olayemi, A., Wendelen, W. & Colyn, M. 2010. Mitochondrial DNA and morphometrical identification of a new species of Hylomyscus (Rodentia: Muridae) from West Africa. Zootaxa 2579:30–44
Mico rondoni	Primates	Ferrari, Sena, Schneider & Silva Jr.	2010	Brazil (Rondonia)	Ferrari, S.F., Sena, L., Schneider, M.P.C. & Silva Jr., J.S. 2010. Rondon's Marmoset, Mico rondoni sp. n., from Southwestern Brazilian Amazonia. International Journal of Primatology 31:693–714 doi:10.1007/s10764-010-9422-6
Microhydromys argenteus	Rodentia	Helgen, Leary & Aplin	2010	Papua New Guinea (New Guinea)	Helgen, K.M., Leary, T. & Aplin, K.P. 2010. A review of Microhydromys (Rodentia, Murinae), with description of a new species from southern New Guinea. American Museum Novitates 3676:1–22
Miniopterus griffithsi	Chiroptera	Goodman, Maminirina, Bradman, Christidis & Appleton	2010	Madagascar	Goodman, S.M., Maminirina, C.P., Bradman, H.M., Christidis, L. & Appleton, B.R. 2010. Patterns of morphological and genetic variation in the endemic Malagasy bat Miniopterus gleni (Chiroptera: Miniopteridae), with the description of a new species, M. griffithsi. Journal of Zoological Systematics and Evolutionary Research 48:75–86
Nomascus annamensis	Primates	Van Ngoc Thinh, Mootnick, Vu Ngoc Thanh, Nadler & Roos	2010	Cambodia, Laos, Vietnam	Van Ngoc Thinh, Mootnick, A.R., Vu Ngoc Thanh, Nadler, T. & Roos, C. 2010. A new species of crested gibbon, from the central Annamite mountain range. Vietnamese Journal of Primatology 4:1–12
Peropteryx pallidoptera	Chiroptera	Lim, Engstrom, Reid, Simmons, Voss & Fleck	2010	Ecuador, Peru	Lim, B.K., Engstrom, M.D., Reid, F.A., Simmons, N.B., Voss, R.S. & Fleck, D.W. 2010. A new species of Peropteryx (Chiroptera, Emballonuridae) from western Amazonia with comments on phylogenetic relationships within the genus. American Museum Novitates 3686:1–20
Philantomba walteri	Artiodactyla	Colyn, Hulselmans, Sonet, Oudé, De Winter, Natta, Nagy & Verheyen	2010	Benin, Nigeria, Togo	Colyn, M., Hulselmans, J., Sonet, G., Oudé, P., De Winter, J., Natta, A., Nagy, Z.T. & Verheyen, E. 2010. Discovery of a new duiker species (Bovidae: Cephalophinae) from the Dahomey Gap, West Africa. Zootaxa 2637:1–30
Phyllotis alisosiensis	Rodentia	Ferro, José Martínez & Barquez	2010	Argentina (Tucuman)	Ferro, L.I., José Martínez, J. & Barquez, R.M. 2010. A new species of Phyllotis (Rodentia, Cricetidae, Sigmodontinae) from Tucumán province, Argentina. Mammalian Biology 75:523–537.
Platyrrhinus angustirostris	Chiroptera	Velazco, Gardner & Patterson	2010	Colombia, Ecuador, Peru, Venezuela	Velazco, P.M., Gardner, A.L. & Patterson, B.D. 2010. Systematics of the Platyrrhinus helleri species complex (Chiroptera: Phyllostomidae), with descriptions of two new species. Zoological Journal of the Linnean Society 159:785–812
Platyrrhinus fusciventris	Chiroptera	Velazco, Gardner & Patterson	2010	Brazil (Amapa, Para), Ecuador, French Guiana, Guyana, Suriname, Trinidad and Tobago, Venezuela	Velazco, P.M., Gardner, A.L. & Patterson, B.D. 2010. Systematics of the Platyrrhinus helleri species complex (Chiroptera: Phyllostomidae), with descriptions of two new species. Zoological Journal of the Linnean Society 159:785–812
Rattus nikenii	Rodentia	Maryanto, Sinaga, Achmadi & Maharadatunkamsi	2010	Indonesia (Gag Island)	Maryanto, I., Sinaga, M.H., Achmadi, A.S. & Maharadatunkamsi 2010. Morphometric variation of Rattus praetor (Thomas, 1888) complex from Papua, with the description of new species of Rattus from Gag Island. Treubia 37:25–48
Rhinopithecus strykeri	Primates	Geissmann, Lwin, S.S.Aung, T.N.Aung, Z.M.Aung, Htin Hla, Grindley & Momberg	2010	Myanmar	Geissmann, T., Lwin, N., Aung, S.S., Aung, T.N., Aung, Z.M., Htin Hla, T., Grindley, M. & Momberg, F. 2010. A new species of snub-nosed monkey, genus Rhinopithecus Milne-Edwards, 1872 (Primates, Colobinae), from northern Kachin state, northeastern Myanmar. American Journal of Primatology 73:96–107
Salanoia durrelli	Carnivora	Durbin, Funk, Hawkins, Hills, Jenkins, Moncrieff & Ralainasolo	2010	Madagascar	Durbin, J., Funk, S.M., Hawkins, F., Hills, D.M., Jenkins, P.D., Moncrieff, C.B. & Ralainasolo, F.B. 2010. Investigations into the status of a new taxon of Salanoia (Mammalia: Carnivora: Eupleridae) from the marshes of Lac Alaotra, Madagascar. Systematics and Biodiversity 8:341–355
Tarsius wallacei	Primates	Merker, Driller, Dahruddin, Wirdateti, Sinaga, Perwitasari-Farajallah & Shekelle	2010	Indonesia (Sulawesi)	Merker, S., Driller, C., Dahruddin, H., Wirdateti, Sinaga, W. Perwitasari-Farajallah, D. & Shekelle, M. 2010. Tarsius wallacei: A New Tarsier Species from Central Sulawesi Occupies a Discontinuous Range. International Journal of Primatology 31:1107–1122 doi:10.1007/s10764-010-9452-0
Acomys muzei	Rodentia	Verheyen, Hulselmans, Wendelen, Leirs, Corti, Backeljau & Verheyen	2011	Tanzania	Verheyen, W., Hulselmans, J., Wendelen, W., Leirs, H., Corti, M., Backeljau, T. & Verheyen, E. 2011. Contribution to the systematics and zoogeography of the East-African Acomys spinosissimus Peters 1852 species complex and the description of two new species (Rodentia: Muridae). Zootaxa 3059:1–35
Acomys ngurui	Rodentia	Verheyen, Hulselmans, Wendelen, Leirs, Corti, Backeljau & Verheyen	2011	Tanzania	Verheyen, W., Hulselmans, J., Wendelen, W., Leirs, H., Corti, M., Backeljau, T. & Verheyen, E. 2011. Contribution to the systematics and zoogeography of the East-African Acomys spinosissimus Peters 1852 species complex and the description of two new species (Rodentia: Muridae). Zootaxa 3059:1–35
Apomys aurorae	Rodentia	Heaney, Balete, Rickart, Alviola, M.R.M.Duya, M.V.Duya, Veluz, VandeVrede & Steppan	2011	Philippines (Luzon)	Heaney, L.R., Balete, D.S., Rickart, E.A., Alviola, P.A., Duya, M.R.M., Duya, M.V., Veluz, M.J., VandeVrede, L. & Steppan, S.J. 2011. Chapter 1: Seven New Species and a New Subgenus of Forest Mice (Rodentia: Muridae: Apomys) from Luzon Island. Fieldiana Life and Earth Sciences 2:1–60
Apomys banahao	Rodentia	Heaney, Balete, Rickart, Alviola, M.R.M.Duya, M.V.Duya, Veluz, VandeVrede & Steppan	2011	Philippines (Luzon)	Heaney, L.R., Balete, D.S., Rickart, E.A., Alviola, P.A., Duya, M.R.M., Duya, M.V., Veluz, M.J., VandeVrede, L. & Steppan, S.J. 2011. Chapter 1: Seven New Species and a New Subgenus of Forest Mice (Rodentia: Muridae: Apomys) from Luzon Island. Fieldiana Life and Earth Sciences 2:1–60
Apomys brownorum	Rodentia	Heaney, Balete, Rickart, Alviola, M.R.M.Duya, M.V.Duya, Veluz, VandeVrede & Steppan	2011	Philippines (Luzon)	Heaney, L.R., Balete, D.S., Rickart, E.A., Alviola, P.A., Duya, M.R.M., Duya, M.V., Veluz, M.J., VandeVrede, L. & Steppan, S.J. 2011. Chapter 1: Seven New Species and a New Subgenus of Forest Mice (Rodentia: Muridae: Apomys) from Luzon Island. Fieldiana Life and Earth Sciences 2:1–60
Apomys magnus	Rodentia	Heaney, Balete, Rickart, Alviola, M.R.M.Duya, M.V.Duya, Veluz, VandeVrede & Steppan	2011	Philippines (Luzon)	Heaney, L.R., Balete, D.S., Rickart, E.A., Alviola, P.A., Duya, M.R.M., Duya, M.V., Veluz, M.J., VandeVrede, L. & Steppan, S.J. 2011. Chapter 1: Seven New Species and a New Subgenus of Forest Mice (Rodentia: Muridae: Apomys) from Luzon Island. Fieldiana Life and Earth Sciences 2:1–60
Apomys minganensis	Rodentia	Heaney, Balete, Rickart, Alviola, M.R.M.Duya, M.V.Duya, Veluz, VandeVrede & Steppan	2011	Philippines (Luzon)	Heaney, L.R., Balete, D.S., Rickart, E.A., Alviola, P.A., Duya, M.R.M., Duya, M.V., Veluz, M.J., VandeVrede, L. & Steppan, S.J. 2011. Chapter 1: Seven New Species and a New Subgenus of Forest Mice (Rodentia: Muridae: Apomys) from Luzon Island. Fieldiana Life and Earth Sciences 2:1–60
Apomys sierrae	Rodentia	Heaney, Balete, Rickart, Alviola, M.R.M.Duya, M.V.Duya, Veluz, VandeVrede & Steppan	2011	Philippines (Palaui)	Heaney, L.R., Balete, D.S., Rickart, E.A., Alviola, P.A., Duya, M.R.M., Duya, M.V., Veluz, M.J., VandeVrede, L. & Steppan, S.J. 2011. Chapter 1: Seven New Species and a New Subgenus of Forest Mice (Rodentia: Muridae: Apomys) from Luzon Island. Fieldiana Life and Earth Sciences 2:1–60
Apomys zambalensis	Rodentia	Heaney, Balete, Rickart, Alviola, M.R.M.Duya, M.V.Duya, Veluz, VandeVrede & Steppan	2011	Philippines (Luzon)	Heaney, L.R., Balete, D.S., Rickart, E.A., Alviola, P.A., Duya, M.R.M., Duya, M.V., Veluz, M.J., VandeVrede, L. & Steppan, S.J. 2011. Chapter 1: Seven New Species and a New Subgenus of Forest Mice (Rodentia: Muridae: Apomys) from Luzon Island. Fieldiana Life and Earth Sciences 2:1–60
Asellia arabica	Chiroptera	Benda, Vallo & Reiter	2011	Saudi Arabia, Yemen	Benda, P., Vallo, P. & Reiter, A. 2011. Taxonomic Revision of the Genus Asellia (Chiroptera: Hipposideridae) with a Description of a New Species from Southern Arabia. Acta Chiropterologica 13:245–270
Cerradomys goytaca	Rodentia	Corrêa Tavares, Pessôa & Gonçalves	2011	Brazil (Espirito Santo, Rio de Janeiro)	Corrêa Tavares, W., Pessôa, L.M. & Gonçalves, P.R. 2011. New species of Cerradomys from coastal sandy plains of southeastern Brazil (Cricetidae: Sigmodontinae). Journal of Mammalogy 92:645–658
Cryptomys ilariae	Rodentia	Gippoliti & Amori	2011	Somalia	Gippoliti, S. & Amori, G. 2011. A new species of mole-rat (Rodentia, Bathyergidae) from the Horn of Africa. Zootaxa 2918:39–46
Cryptotis oreoryctes	Eulipotyphla	Woodman	2011	Guatemala	Woodman, N. 2011. Patterns of morphological variation amongst semifossorial shrews in the highlands of Guatemala, with the description of a new species (Mammalia, Soricomorpha, Soricidae). Zoological Journal of the Linnean Society 163:1267–1288
Drymoreomys albimaculatus	Rodentia	Percequillo, Weksler & Costa	2011	Brazil (Santa Catarina, São Paulo)	Percequillo, A.R., Weksler, M. & Costa, L.P. 2011. A new genus and species of rodent from the Brazilian Atlantic Forest (Rodentia: Cricetidae: Sigmodontinae: Oryzomyini), with comments on oryzomyine biogeography. Zoological Journal of the Linnean Society 161:357–390
Fukomys ilariae	Rodentia	Gippoliti & Amori	2011	Somalia	Gippoliti, S. & Amori, G. 2011. A new species of mole-rat (Rodentia, Bathyergidae) from the Horn of Africa. Zootaxa 2918: 39–46
Glischropus bucephalus	Chiroptera	Csorba	2011	Cambodia	Csorba, G. 2011. A new species of Glischropus from the Indochinese Subregion (Mammalia: Chiroptera: Vespertilionidae). Zootaxa 2925:41–48
Grammomys selousi	Rodentia	Denys, Lalis, Lecompte, Cornette, Moulin, Makundi, Machang'u, Volobouev & Aniskine	2011	Tanzania	Denys, C., Lalis, A., Lecompte, É., Cornette, R., Moulin, S., Makundi, R., Machang'u, R., Volobouev, V. & Aniskine, V.M. 2011. A faunal survey in Kingu Pira (south Tanzania), with new karyotypes of several small mammals and the description of a new Murid species (Mammalia, Rodentia). Zoosystema 33:5–47
Hipposideros einnaythu	Chiroptera	Douangboubpha, Bumrungsri, Satasook, Soisook, Si Si Hla Bu, Aul, Harrison, Pearch, Thomas & Bates	2011	Myanmar	Douangboubpha, B., Bumrungsri, S., Satasook, C., Soisook, P., Hla Bu, S.S., Aul, B., Harrison, D.L., Pearch, M.J., Thomas, N.M. & Bates, P.J.J. 2011. A New Species of Small Hipposideros (Chiroptera: Hipposideridae) from Myanmar and a Revaluation of the Taxon H. nicobarulae Miller, 1902 from the Nicobar Islands. Acta Chiropterologica 13:61–78
Hypsugo lanzai	Chiroptera	Benda, Al-Jumaily, Reiter & Nasher	2011	Yemen	Benda, P., Al-Jumaily, M.M., Reiter, A. & Nasher, A.K. 2011. Noteworthy records of bats from Yemen with description of a new species from Socotra. Hystrix 22:23–56
Melogale cucphuongensis	Carnivora	Nadler, Streicher, Stefen, Schwierz & Roos	2011	Vietnam	Nadler, T., Streicher, U., Stefen, C., Schwierz, E. & Roos, C. 2011. A new species of ferret-badger, Genus Melogale, from Vietnam. Der Zoologische Garten 80:271–286
Micronycteris buriri	Chiroptera	Larsen, Siles, Pedersen & Kwiecinski	2011	Saint Vincent and the Grenadines	Larsen, P.A., Siles, L., Pedersen, S.C. & Kwiecinski, G.G. 2011. A new species of Micronycteris (Chiroptera: Phyllostomidae) from Saint Vincent, Lesser Antilles. Mammalian Biology 76:687–700
Miniopterus egeri	Chiroptera	Goodman, Ramasindrazana, Maminirina, Schoeman & Appleton	2011	Madagascar	Goodman, S.M., Ramasindrazana, B., Maminirina, C.P., Schoeman, M.C. & Appleton, B. 2011. Morphological, bioacoustical, and genetic variation in Miniopterus bats from eastern Madagascar, with the description of a new species. Zootaxa 2880:1–19
Molossus alvarezi	Chiroptera	González-Ruiz, Ramírez-Pulido & Arroyo-Cabrales	2011	Mexico (Quintana Roo, Yucatán)	González-Ruiz, N., Ramírez-Pulido, J. & Arroyo-Cabrales, J. 2011. A new species of mastiff bat (Chiroptera: Molossidae: Molossus) from Mexico. Mammalian Biology 76:461–469
Murina beelzebub	Chiroptera	Son, Furey & Csorba	2011	Vietnam	Csorba, G., Son, N.T., Saveng, I. & Furey, N.M. 2011. Revealing cryptic bat diversity: three new Murina and redescription of M. tubinaris from Southeast Asia. Journal of Mammalogy 92:891–904
Murina chrysochaetes	Chiroptera	Eger & Lim	2011	China (Guangxi)	Eger, J.L. & Lim, B.K. 2011. Three New Species of Murina from Southern China (Chiroptera: Vespertilionidae). Acta Chiropterologica 13:227–243
Murina cineracea	Chiroptera	Csorba & Furey	2011	Cambodia	Csorba, G., Son, N.T., Saveng, I. & Furey, N.M. 2011. Revealing cryptic bat diversity: three new Murina and redescription of M. tubinaris from Southeast Asia. Journal of Mammalogy 92:891–904
Murina lorelieae	Chiroptera	Eger & Lim	2011	China (Guangxi)	Eger, J.L. & Lim, B.K. 2011. Three New Species of Murina from Southern China (Chiroptera: Vespertilionidae). Acta Chiropterologica 13:227–243
Murina shuipuensis	Chiroptera	Eger & Lim	2011	China (Guizhou)	Eger, J.L. & Lim, B.K. 2011. Three New Species of Murina from Southern China (Chiroptera: Vespertilionidae). Acta Chiropterologica 13:227–243
Murina walstoni	Chiroptera	Furey, Csorba & Son	2011	Cambodia	Csorba, G., Son, N.T., Saveng, I. & Furey, N.M. 2011. Revealing cryptic bat diversity: three new Murina and redescription of M. tubinaris from Southeast Asia. Journal of Mammalogy 92:891–904
Myosorex bururiensis	Eulipotyphla	Peterhans & Hutterer	2011	Burundi, Congo (Dem. Rep.)	Peterhans, J.C.K., Hutterer, R., Mwanga, J., Ndara, B., Davenport, L., Karhagomba, I.B. & Udelhoven, J. 2011. African shrews endemic to the Albertine Rift: two new species of Myosorex (Mammalia: Soricidae) from Burundi and the Democratic Republic of Congo. Journal of East African Natural History 99:103–128
Myosorex jejei	Eulipotyphla	Peterhans & Hutterer	2011	Burundi, Congo (Dem. Rep.)	Peterhans, J.C.K., Hutterer, R., Mwanga, J., Ndara, B., Davenport, L., Karhagomba, I.B. & Udelhoven, J. 2011. African shrews endemic to the Albertine Rift: two new species of Myosorex (Mammalia: Soricidae) from Burundi and the Democratic Republic of Congo. Journal of East African Natural History 99:103–128
Myotis badius	Chiroptera	Tiunov, Kruskop & Feng	2011	China (Yunnan)	Tiunov, M.P., Kruskop, S.V. & Feng, J. 2011. A New Mouse-Eared Bat (Mammalia: Chiroptera, Vespertilionidae) from South China. Acta Chiropterologica 13:271–278
Myotis diminutus	Chiroptera	Moratellia & Wilson	2011	Ecuador	Moratelli, R. & Wilson, D.E. 2011. A new species of Myotis Kaup, 1829 (Chiroptera, Vespertilionidae) from Ecuador. Mammalian Biology 76:608–614
Myotis izecksohni	Chiroptera	Moratelli, Peracchi, Dias & de Oliveira	2011	Brazil (Parana, Rio de Janeiro)	Moratelli, R., Peracchi, A.L., Dias, D. & de Oliveira, J.A. 2011. Geographic variation in South American populations of Myotis nigricans (Schinz, 1821) (Chiroptera, Vespertilionidae), with the description of two new species. Mammalian Biology 76:592–607
Myotis lavali	Chiroptera	Moratelli, Peracchi, Dias & de Oliveira	2011	Brazil (Bahia, Ceara, Pernambuco)	Moratelli, R., Peracchi, A.L., Dias, D. & de Oliveira, J.A. 2011. Geographic variation in South American populations of Myotis nigricans (Schinz, 1821) (Chiroptera, Vespertilionidae), with the description of two new species. Mammalian Biology 76:592–607
Otomys cheesmani	Rodentia	Taylor, Lavrenchenko, Carleton, Verheyen, Bennett, Oosthuizen & Maree	2011	Ethiopia	Taylor, P.J., Lavrenchenko, L.A., Carleton, M.D., Verheyen, E., Bennett, N.C., Oosthuizen, C.J. & Maree, S. 2011. Specific limits and emerging diversity patterns in East African populations of laminate-toothed rats, genus Otomys (Muridae: Murinae: Otomyini): Revision of the Otomys typus complex. Zootaxa 3024:1–66
Otomys simiensis	Rodentia	Taylor, Lavrenchenko, Carleton, Verheyen, Bennett, Oosthuizen & Maree	2011	Ethiopia	Taylor, P.J., Lavrenchenko, L.A., Carleton, M.D., Verheyen, E., Bennett, N.C., Oosthuizen, C.J. & Maree, S. 2011. Specific limits and emerging diversity patterns in East African populations of laminate-toothed rats, genus Otomys (Muridae: Murinae: Otomyini): Revision of the Otomys typus complex. Zootaxa 3024:1–66
Otomys yaldeni	Rodentia	Taylor, Lavrenchenko, Carleton, Verheyen, Bennett, Oosthuizen & Maree	2011	Ethiopia	Taylor, P.J., Lavrenchenko, L.A., Carleton, M.D., Verheyen, E., Bennett, N.C., Oosthuizen, C.J. & Maree, S. 2011. Specific limits and emerging diversity patterns in East African populations of laminate-toothed rats, genus Otomys (Muridae: Murinae: Otomyini): Revision of the Otomys typus complex. Zootaxa 3024:1–66
Rhinolophus schnitzleri	Chiroptera	Wu & Thong	2011	China (Yunnan)	Wu, Y. & Thong, V.D. 2011. A New Species of Rhinolophus (Chiroptera: Rhinolophidae) from China. Zoological Science 28:235–241
Rhipidomys ipukensis	Rodentia	Rocha, B.M.A.Costa & L.P.Costa	2011	Brazil (Tocantins)	Rocha, R.G., Ferreira, E., Costa, B.M.A., Martins, I.C.M., Leite, Y.L.R., Costa, L.P. & Fonseca, C. 2011. Small mammals of the mid-Araguaia River in central Brazil, with the description of a new species of climbing rat. Zootaxa 2789:1–34
Rhipidomys itoan	Rodentia	B.M.A.Costa, Geise, Pereira & L.P.Costa	2011	Brazil (Rio de Janeiro, São Paulo)	Costa, B.M.A., Geise, L., Pereira, L.G. & Costa, L.P. 2011. Phylogeography of Rhipidomys (Rodentia: Cricetidae: Sigmodontinae) and description of two new species from southeastern Brazil. Journal of Mammalogy 92:945–962
Rhipidomys tribei	Rodentia	B.M.A.Costa, Geise, Pereira & L.P.Costa	2011	Brazil (Minas Gerais)	Costa, B.M.A., Geise, L., Pereira, L.G. & Costa, L.P. 2011. Phylogeography of Rhipidomys (Rodentia: Cricetidae: Sigmodontinae) and description of two new species from southeastern Brazil. Journal of Mammalogy 92:945–962
Sturnira perla	Chiroptera	Jarrín & Kunz	2011	Ecuador	Jarrín, P. & Kunz, T.H. 2011. A new species of Sturnira (Chiroptera: Phyllostomidae) from the Choco forest of Ecuador. Zootaxa 2755:1–35
Tursiops australis	Cetacea	Charlton-Robb, Gershwin, Thompson, Austin, Owen & McKechnie	2011	Australia	Charlton-Robb, K., Gershwin, L.-A., Thompson, R., Austin, J., Owen, K. & McKechnie, S. 2011. A New Dolphin Species, the Burrunan Dolphin Tursiops australis sp. nov., Endemic to Southern Australian Coastal Waters. PLoS ONE 6 (9): e24047
Antechinus mysticus	Dasyuromorphia	Baker, Mutton & Van Dyck	2012	Australia (Queensland)	Baker, A.M., Mutton, T.Y. & Van Dyck, S. 2012. A new dasyurid marsupial from eastern Queensland, Australia: the Buff-footed Antechinus, Antechinus mysticus sp. nov. (Marsupialia: Dasyuridae). Zootaxa 3515:1–37
Archboldomys maximus	Rodentia	Balete, Rickart, Heaney, Alviola, M.V.Duya, M.R.M.Duya, Sosa & Jansa	2012	Philippines (Luzon)	Balete, D.S., Rickart, E.A., Heaney, L.R., Alviola, P.A., Duya, M.V., Duya, M.R.M., Sosa, T. & Jansa, S.A. 2012. Archboldomys (Muridae, Murinae) reconsidered : a new genus and three new species of shrew mice from Luzon Island, Philippines. American Museum Novitates 3754:1–60
Callicebus vieirai	Primates	Gualda-Barros, Nascimento & Amaral	2012	Brazil (Mato Grosso, Para)	Gualda-Barros, J., Nascimento, F.O. & Amaral, M.K. 2012. A new species of Callicebus Thomas, 1903 (Primates, Pitheciidae) from the states of Mato Grosso and Pará, Brazil. Papéis Avulsos de Zoologia 52: 261–279.
Cercopithecus lomamiensis	Primates	Hart, Detwiler, Gilbert, Burrell, Fuller, Emetshu, Hart, Vosper, Sargis & Tosi	2012	Congo (Dem. Rep.)	Hart, J.A., Detwiler, K.M., Gilbert, C.C., Burrell, A.S., Fuller, J.L., Emetshu, M., Hart, T.B., Vosper, A., Sargis, E.J. & Tosi, A.J. 2012. Lesula: A New Species of Cercopithecus Monkey Endemic to the Democratic Republic of Congo and Implications for Conservation of Congo's Central Basin. PLoS ONE 7 (9): e44271
Coleura kibomalandy	Chiroptera	Goodman, Puechmaille, Friedli-Weyeneth, Gerlach, Ruedi, Schoeman, Stanley & Teeling	2012	Madagascar	Goodman, S.M., Puechmaille, S.J., Friedli-Weyeneth, N., Gerlach, J., Ruedi, M., Schoeman, M.C., Stanley, W.T. & Teeling, E.C. 2012. Phylogeny of the Emballonurini (Emballonuridae) with descriptions of a new genus and species from Madagascar. Journal of Mammalogy 93: 1440–1455
Cryptotis aroensis	Eulipotyphla	Quiroga-Carmona & Molinari	2012	Venezuela	Quiroga-Carmona, M. & Molinari, J. 2012. Description of a new shrew of the genus Cryptotis (Mammalia: Soricomorpha: Soricidae) from the Sierra de Aroa, an isolated mountain range in northwestern Venezuela, with remarks on biogeography and conservation. Zootaxa 3441: 1–20
Ctenomys ibicuiensis	Rodentia	de Freitas, Fernandes, Fornel & Roratto	2012	Brazil (Rio Grande do Sul)	de Freitas, T.R.O., Fernandes, F.A., Fornel, R. & Roratto, P.A. 2012. An endemic new species of tuco-tuco, genus Ctenomys (Rodentia: Ctenomyidae), with a restricted geographic distribution in southern Brazil. Journal of Mammalogy 93: 1355–1367
Dendromus lachaisei	Rodentia	Denys & Aniskine	2012	Guinea	Denys, C. & Aniskine, V. 2012. On a new species of Dendromus (Rodentia, Nesomyidae) from Mount Nimba, Guinea. Mammalia 76: 295–308
Dryadonycteris capixaba	Chiroptera	Nogueira, Lima, Peracchi & Simmons	2012	Brazil (Espirito Santo)	Nogueira, M.R., Lima, I.P., Peracchi, A.L. & Simmons, N.B. 2012. New Genus and Species of Nectar-Feeding Bat from the Atlantic Forest of Southeastern Brazil (Chiroptera: Phyllostomidae: Glossophaginae). American Museum Novitates 3747:1–30
Euroscaptor subanura	Eulipotyphla	Kawada, Son & Can	2012	Vietnam	Kawada, S., Son, N.T. & Can, D.N. 2012. A new species of mole of the genus Euroscaptor (Soricomorpha, Talpidae) from northern Vietnam. Journal of Mammalogy 93: 839–850
Hipposideros griffini	Chiroptera	Thong, Puechmaille, Denzinger, Dietz, Csorba, Bates, Teeling & Schnitzler	2012	Vietnam	Thong, V.D., Puechmaille, S.J., Denzinger, A., Dietz, C., Csorba, G., Bates, P.J.J., Teeling, E.C. & Schnitzler, H.-U. 2012. A new species of Hipposideros (Chiroptera: Hipposideridae) from Vietnam. Journal of Mammalogy 93:1–11
Lophostoma kalkoae	Chiroptera	Velazco & Gardner	2012	Panama	Velazco, P.M. & Gardner, A.L. 2012. A new species of Lophostoma d'Orbigny, 1836 (Chiroptera: Phyllostomidae) from Panama. Journal of Mammalogy 93:605–614
Margaretamys christinae	Rodentia	Mortelliti, Castiglia, Amori, Maryanto & Musser	2012	Indonesia (Sulawesi)	Mortelliti, A., Castiglia, R., Amori, G., Maryanto, I. & Musser, G.G. 2012. A new species of Margaretamys (Rodentia: Muridae: Murinae: Rattini) from Pegunungan Mekongga, southeastern Sulawesi, Indonesia. Tropical Zoology 25: 74–107
Maxomys tajuddinii	Rodentia	Achmadi, Maryanto & Maharadatunkamsi	2012	Indonesia (Kalimantan, Sumatra), Malaysia (peninsular, Sabah, Sarawak)	Achmadi, A.S., Maryanto, I. & Maharadatunkamsi. 2012. Systematic and description of new species of Maxomys (Muridae). Treubia 39: 1–26
Microcebus gerpi	Primates	Radespiel, Ratsimbazafy, Rasoloharijaona, Raveloson, Andriaholinirina, Rakotondravony, Randrianarison & Randrianambinina	2012	Madagascar	Radespiel, U., Ratsimbazafy, J.H., Rasoloharijaona, S., Raveloson, H., Andriaholinirina, N., Rakotondravony, R., Randrianarison, R.M. & Randrianambinina, B. 2012. First indications of a highland specialist among mouse lemurs (Microcebus spp.) and evidence for a new mouse lemur species from eastern Madagascar. Primates 53: 157–170
Monodelphis arlindoi	Didelphimorphia	Pavan, Rossi & Schneider	2012	Brazil (Para)	Pavan, S.E., Rossi, R.V. & Schneider, H. 2012. Species diversity in the Monodelphis brevicaudata complex (Didelphimorphia: Didelphidae) inferred from molecular and morphological data, with the description of a new species. Zoological Journal of the Linnean Society 165:190–223
Monodelphis gardneri	Didelphimorphia	Solari, Pacheco, Vivar & Emmons	2012	Peru	Solari, S., Pacheco, V., Vivar, E. & Emmons, L.H. 2012. A new species of Monodelphis (Mammalia: Didelphimorphia: Didelphidae) from the montane forests of central Perú. Proceedings of the Biological Society of Washington 125: 295–307
Monodelphis sanctaerosae	Didelphimorphia	Voss, Pine & Solari	2012	Bolivia	Voss, R.S., Pine, R.H. & Solari, S. 2012. A New Species of the Didelphid Marsupial Genus Monodelphis from Eastern Bolivia. American Museum Novitates 3740:1–14
Murina annamitica	Chiroptera	Francis & Eger	2012	Laos	Francis, C.M. & Eger, J.L. 2012. A Review of Tube-Nosed Bats (Murina) from Laos with a Description of Two New Species. Acta Chiropterologica 14:15–38
Murina fionae	Chiroptera	Francis & Eger	2012	Laos	Francis, C.M. & Eger, J.L. 2012. A Review of Tube-Nosed Bats (Murina) from Laos with a Description of Two New Species. Acta Chiropterologica 14:15–38
Murina jaintiana	Chiroptera	Ruedi, Biswas & Csorba	2012	India (Meghalaya), Myanmar	Ruedi, M., Biswas, J. & Csorba, G. 2012. Bats from the wet: two new species of Tube-nosed bats (Chiroptera: Vespertilionidae) from Meghalaya, India. Revue Suisse de Zoologie 119:111–135
Murina pluvialis	Chiroptera	Ruedi, Biswas & Csorba	2012	India (Meghalaya), Bangladesh	Ruedi, M., Biswas, J. & Csorba, G. 2012. Bats from the wet: two new species of Tube-nosed bats (Chiroptera: Vespertilionidae) from Meghalaya, India. Revue Suisse de Zoologie 119:111–135
Neodon linzhiensis	Rodentia	Liu, Sun, Liu, Wang, Guo & Murphy	2012	China (Xizang)	Liu, S.Y., Sun, Z.Y., Liu, Y., Wang, H., Guo, P. & Murphy, R.W. 2012. A new vole from Xizang, China and the molecular phylogeny of the genus Neodon (Cricetidae: Arvicolinae). Zootaxa 3235: 1–22
Neoromicia robertsi	Chiroptera	Goodman, Taylor, Ratrimomanarivo & Hoofer	2012	Madagascar	Goodman, S.M., Taylor, P.J., Ratrimomanarivo, F. & Hoofer, S.R. 2012. The genus Neoromicia (Family Vespertilionidae) in Madagascar, with the description of a new species. Zootaxa 3250: 1–25
Paucidentomys vermidax	Rodentia	Esselstyn, Achmadi & Rowe	2012	Indonesia (Sulawesi)	Esselstyn, J.A., Achmadi, A.S. & Rowe, K.C. 2012. Evolutionary novelty in a rat with no molars. Biology Letters
Rhinolophus cohenae	Chiroptera	Taylor, Stoffberg, Monadjem, Schoeman, Bayliss & Cotterill	2012	South Africa	Taylor, P.J., Stoffberg, S., Monadjem, A., Schoeman, M.C., Bayliss, J. & Cotterill, F.P.D. 2012. Four New Bat Species (Rhinolophus hildebrandtii Complex) Reflect Plio-Pleistocene Divergence of Dwarfs and Giants across an Afromontane Archipelago. PLoS ONE 7 (9): e41744
Rhinolophus mabuensis	Chiroptera	Taylor, Stoffberg, Monadjem, Schoeman, Bayliss & Cotterill	2012	Mozambique	Taylor, P.J., Stoffberg, S., Monadjem, A., Schoeman, M.C., Bayliss, J. & Cotterill, F.P.D. 2012. Four New Bat Species (Rhinolophus hildebrandtii Complex) Reflect Plio-Pleistocene Divergence of Dwarfs and Giants across an Afromontane Archipelago. PLoS ONE 7 (9): e41744
Rhinolophus mossambicus	Chiroptera	Taylor, Stoffberg, Monadjem, Schoeman, Bayliss & Cotterill	2012	Mozambique, Zimbabwe	Taylor, P.J., Stoffberg, S., Monadjem, A., Schoeman, M.C., Bayliss, J. & Cotterill, F.P.D. 2012. Four New Bat Species (Rhinolophus hildebrandtii Complex) Reflect Plio-Pleistocene Divergence of Dwarfs and Giants across an Afromontane Archipelago. PLoS ONE 7 (9): e41744
Rhinolophus smithersi	Chiroptera	Taylor, Stoffberg, Monadjem, Schoeman, Bayliss & Cotterill	2012	South Africa, Zimbabwe	Taylor, P.J., Stoffberg, S., Monadjem, A., Schoeman, M.C., Bayliss, J. & Cotterill, F.P.D. 2012. Four New Bat Species (Rhinolophus hildebrandtii Complex) Reflect Plio-Pleistocene Divergence of Dwarfs and Giants across an Afromontane Archipelago. PLoS ONE 7 (9): e41744
Rhogeessa bickhami	Chiroptera	Baird, Marchán-Rivadeneira, Pérez & Baker	2012	Costa Rica, El Salvador, Guatemala, Honduras, Mexico (Chiapas), Nicaragua	Baird, A.B., Marchán-Rivadeneira, M.R., Pérez, S.G. & Baker, R.J. 2012. Morphological analysis and description of two new species of Rhogeessa (Chiroptera: Vespertilionidae) from the Neotropics. Occasional Papers, Museum of Texas Tech University 307: 1–25
Rhogeessa menchuae	Chiroptera	Baird, Marchán-Rivadeneira, Pérez & Baker	2012	Guatemala, Honduras	Baird, A.B., Marchán-Rivadeneira, M.R., Pérez, S.G. & Baker, R.J. 2012. Morphological analysis and description of two new species of Rhogeessa (Chiroptera: Vespertilionidae) from the Neotropics. Occasional Papers, Museum of Texas Tech University 307: 1–25
Soricomys leonardocoi	Rodentia	Balete, Rickart, Heaney, Alviola, M.V.Duya, M.R.M.Duya, Sosa & Jansa	2012	Philippines (Luzon)	Balete, D.S., Rickart, E.A., Heaney, L.R., Alviola, P.A., Duya, M.V., Duya, M.R.M., Sosa, T. & Jansa, S.A. 2012. Archboldomys (Muridae, Murinae) reconsidered : a new genus and three new species of shrew mice from Luzon Island, Philippines. American Museum Novitates 3754:1–60
Soricomys montanus	Rodentia	Balete, Rickart, Heaney, Alviola, M.V.Duya, M.R.M.Duya, Sosa & Jansa	2012	Philippines (Luzon)	Balete, D.S., Rickart, E.A., Heaney, L.R., Alviola, P.A., Duya, M.V., Duya, M.R.M., Sosa, T. & Jansa, S.A. 2012. Archboldomys (Muridae, Murinae) reconsidered : a new genus and three new species of shrew mice from Luzon Island, Philippines. American Museum Novitates 3754:1–60
Thoopterus suhaniahae	Chiroptera	Maryanto, Yani, Prijono & Wiantoro	2012	Indonesia (Sulawesi, Talaud, Wowoni)	Maryanto, I., Yani, M., Prijono, S.N. & Wiantoro, S. 2012. A new species of fruit bat (Megachiroptera: Pteropodidae: Thoopterus) from Sulawesi and adjacent islands, Indonesia. Records of the Western Australian Museum 27: 68–84
Akodon josemariarguedasi	Rodentia	Jiménez, Pacheco & Vivas	2013	Peru	Jiménez, C.F., Pacheco, V. & Vivas, D. 2013. An introduction to the systematics of Akodon orophilus Osgood, 1913 (Rodentia: Cricetidae) with the description of a new species. Zootaxa 3669 (3): 223–242.
Antechinus argentus	Dasyuromorpha	Baker, Mutton & Hines	2013	Australia (Queensland)	Baker, A.M., Mutton, T.Y. & Hines, H.B. 2013. A new dasyurid marsupial from Kroombit Tops, south-east Queensland, Australia: the Silver-headed Antechinus, Antechinus argentus sp. nov. (Marsupialia: Dasyuridae). Zootaxa 3746 (2): 201–239.
Bassaricyon neblina	Carnivora	K.Helgen, Pinto, Kays, L.Helgen, Tsuchiya, Quinn, Wilson & Maldonado	2013	Colombia, Ecuador	Helgen, K.M., Pinto, M., Kays, R., Helgen, L., Tsuchiya, M., Quinn, A., Wilson, D. & Maldonado, J. 2013. Taxonomic revision of the olingos (Bassaricyon), with description of a new species, the Olinguito. ZooKeys 324: 1–83.
Biswamoyopterus laoensis	Rodentia	Sanamxay, Douangboubpha, Bumrungsri, Xayavong, Xayaphet, Satasook & Bates	2013	Laos	Sanamxay, D., Douangboubpha, B., Bumrungsri, S., Xayavong, S., Xayaphet, V., Satasook, C. & Bates, P.J.J. 2013. Rediscovery of Biswamoyopterus (Mammalia: Rodentia: Sciuridae: Pteromyini) in Asia, with the description of a new species from Lao PDR. Zootaxa 3686: 471–481
Caenolestes sangay	Paucituberculata	Oajala-Barbour, Pinto, Brito M., Albuja V. & Patterson	2013	Ecuador	Ojala-Barbour, R., Pinto, C.M., Brito M., J., Albuja V., L., Lee, Jr., T.E. & Patterson, B.D. (2013). A new species of shrew-opossum (Paucituberculata: Caenolestide) with a phylogeny of extant caenolestid. Journal of Mammalogy 94 (5): 967–982
Cheirogaleus lavasoensis	Primates	Thiele, Razafimahatratra & Hapke	2013	Madagascar	Thiele, D., Razafimahatratra, E. & Hapke, A. 2013. Discrepant partitioning of genetic diversity in mouse lemurs and dwarf lemurs – Biological reality or taxonomic bias? Molecular Phylogenetics and Evolution 69: 593–609
Coendou baturitensis	Rodentia	Feijó & Langguth	2013	Brazil (Ceara)	Feijó, A. & Langguth, A. 2013. Mamíferos de Médio e Grande Porte doNordeste do Brasil: Distribuição e Taxonomia, com Descrição deNovas Espécies. Revista Nordestina de Biologia 22: 3–225
Coendou speratus	Rodentia	Pontes, Gadelha, Melo, de Sá, Loss, Junior, Costa & Leite	2013	Brazil (Pernambuco)	Pontes, A.R.M., Gadelha, J.R., Melo, É.R.A., de Sá, F.B., Loss, A.C., Junior, V.C., Costa, L.P. & Leite, Y.L.R. 2013. A new species of porcupine, genus Coendou (Rodentia: Erethizontidae) from the Atlantic forest of northeastern Brazil. Zootaxa 3636: 421–438
Crocidura lwiroensis	Eulipotyphla	Kerbis Peterhans & Hutterer	2013	Congo (Dem.Rep.)	Kerbis Peterhans, J.C., Huhndorf, M.H., Plumptre, A.J., Hutterer, R., Kaleme, P. & Ndara, B. 2013. Mammals, other than bats, from the Misotshi-Kabogo highlands (eastern Democratic Republic of Congo), with the description of two new species (Mammalia: Soricidae). Bonn Zoological Bulletin 62: 203–219
Crocidura sapaensis	Eulipotyphla	Jenkins, Abramov, Bannikova & Rozhnov	2013	Vietnam	Jenkins, P.D., Abramov, A.V., Bannikova, A.A. & Rozhnov, V.V. 2013. Bones and genes: resolution problems in three Vietnamese species of Crocidura (Mammalia, Soricomorpha, Soricidae) and the description of an additional new species. ZooKeys 313: 61–79.
Cryptotis venezuelensis	Eulipotyphla	Quiroga-Carmona	2013	Venezuela	Quiroga-Carmona, M. 2013. Una nueva especie de musaraña del género Cryptotis (Soricomorpha: Soricidae) de la Serranía del Litoral en el norte de Venezuela. Mastozoología Neotropical 20: 123–137.
Dasyprocta iacki	Rodentia	Feijó & Langguth	2013	Brazil (Paraíba, Pernambuco)	Feijó, A., Langguth, A. 2013. Mamíferos de Médio e Grande Porte do Nordeste do Brasil: Distribuição e Taxonomia, com Descrição de Novas Espécies. Revista Nordestina de Biologia, 22: 3–225
Eligmodontia dunaris	Rodentia	Spotorno, Zuleta, Walker, Manriquez, Valladares & Marin	2013	Chile	Spotorno, A.E., Zuleta, C., Walker, L.I., Manriquez, G., Valladares, P. & Marin, J.C. 2013. A small, new gerbil-mouse Eligmodontia (Rodentia: Cricetidae) from dunes at the coasts and deserts of north-central Chile: molecular, chromosomic, and morphological analyses. Zootaxa 3683: 377–394
Fukomys vandewoestijneae	Rodentia	van Daele, Blondé, Stjernstedt & Adriaens	2013	Congo (Dem.Rep.), Zambia	van Daele, P.A.A.G., Blondé, P., Stjernstedt, R. & Adriaens, D. 2013. A new species of African Mole-rat (Fukomys, Bathyergidae, Rodentia) from the Zaire-Zambezi Watershed. Zootaxa 3636: 171–189
Halmaheramys bokimekot	Rodentia	Fabre, Pagès, Musser, Fitriana, Semiadi & Helgen	2013	Indonesia (Halmahera)	Fabre, P.-H., Pagès, M., Musser, G.G., Fitriana, Y.S., Fjeldså, J., Jennings, A., Jønsson, K.A., Kennedy, J., Michaux, J., Semiadi, G., Supriatna, N. & Helgen, K.M. 2013. A new genus of rodent from Wallacea (Rodentia: Muridae: Murinae: Rattini), and its implication for biogeography and Indo-Pacific Rattini systematics. Zoological Journal of the Linnean Society 169 (2): 408–447
Holochilus lagigliai	Rodentia	Pardiñas, Teta, Voglino & Fernández	2013	Argentina (Mendoza)	Pardiñas, U.F.J., Teta, P., Voglino, D. & Fernández, F.J. 2013. Enlarging rodent diversity in west-central Argentina: a new species of the genus Holochilus (Cricetidae, Sigmodontinae). Journal of Mammalogy 94: 231–240
Lonchophylla peracchii	Chiroptera	Dias, Esbérard & Moratelli	2013	Brazil (Rio de Janeiro)	Dias, D., Esbérad, C.E.L. & Moratelli, R. 2013. A new species of Lonchophylla (Chiroptera, Phyllostomidae) from the Atlantic Forest of southeastern Brazil, with comments on L. bokermanni. Zootaxa 3722 (3): 347–360
Marmosops pakaraimae	Didelphimorphia	Voss, Lim, Díaz-Nieto & Jansa	2013	Guyana, Venezuela	Voss, R.S., Lim, B.K., Díaz-Nieto, J.F. & Jansa, S.A. 2013. A New Species of Marmosops (Marsupialia: Didelphidae) from the Pakaraima Highlands of Guyana, with Remarks on the Origin of the Endemic Pantepui Mammal Fauna. American Museum Novitates 3778: 1–27
Microcebus marohita	Primates	Rasoloarison, Weisrock, Yoder, Rakotondravony & Kappeler	2013	Madagascar	Rasoloarison, R.M., Weisrock, D.W., Yoder, A.D., Rakotondravony, D. & Kappeler, P.M. 2013. Two new species of mouse lemurs (Cheirogaleidae: Microcebus) from Eastern Madagascar. International Journal of Primatology 34: 455–469
Microcebus tanosi	Primates	Rasoloarison, Weisrock, Yoder, Rakotondravony & Kappeler	2013	Madagascar	Rasoloarison, R.M., Weisrock, D.W., Yoder, A.D., Rakotondravony, D. & Kappeler, P.M. 2013. Two new species of mouse lemurs (Cheirogaleidae: Microcebus) from Eastern Madagascar. International Journal of Primatology 34: 455–469
Micronycteris yatesi	Chiroptera	Siles & Brooks	2013	Bolivia	Siles, L., Brooks, D.M., Aranibar, H., Tarifa, T., Vargas M., R.J., Rojas, J.M. & Baker, R.J. 2013. A new species of Micronycteris (Chiroptera: Phyllostomidae) from Bolivia. Journal of Mammalogy 94: 881–896
Miniopterus mossambicus	Chiroptera	Monadjem, Goodman, Tanley & Appleton	2013	Mozambique	Monadjem, A., Goodman, S.M., Stanley, W.T. & Appleton, B. 2013. A cryptic new species of Miniopterus from south-eastern Africa based on molecular and morphological characters. Zootaxa 3746 (1): 123–142.
Murina balaensis	Chiroptera	Soisook, Karapan, Satasook & Bates	2013	Thailand	Soisook, P., Karapan, S., Satasook, C. & Bates, P.J.J. 2013. A new species of Murina (Mammalia: Chiroptera: Vespertilionidae) from Peninsular Thailand. Zootaxa. 3746(4): 567–579.
Myosorex kabogoensis	Eulipotyphla	Kerbis Peterhans & Hutterer	2013	Congo (Dem.Rep.)	Kerbis Peterhans, J.C., Huhndorf, M.H., Plumptre, A.J., Hutterer, R., Kaleme, P. & Ndara, B. 2013. Mammals, other than bats, from the Misotshi-Kabogo highlands (eastern Democratic Republic of Congo), with the description of two new species (Mammalia: Soricidae). Bonn Zoological Bulletin 62: 203–219
Myosorex meesteri	Eulipotyphla	Taylor, Kearney, Peterhans, Baxter & Willows-Munro	2013	Mozambique, Zimbabwe	Taylor, P.J., Kearney, T.C., Peterhans, J.C.K., Baxter, R.M. & Willows-Munro, S. 2013. Cryptic diversity in forest shrews of the genus Myosorex from southern Africa, with the description of a new species and comments on Myosorex tenuis. Zoological Journal of the Linnean Society 169 (4): 881–902.
Myotis handleyi	Chiroptera	Moratelli, Gardner, Oliveira & Wilson	2013	Venezuela	Moratelli, R., Gardner, A.L., Oliveira, J.A. de. & Wilson, D.E. (2013) Review of Myotis (Chiroptera, Vespertilionidae) from northern South America, including description of a new species. American Museum Novitates 3780: 1–36
Neoromicia roseveari	Chiroptera	Monadjem, Richards, Taylor & Stoffberg	2013	Liberia	Monadjem, A., Richards, L., Taylor, P.J. & Stoffberg. S. 2013. High diversity of pipistrelloid bats (Vespertilionidae: Hypsugo, Neoromicia, and Pipistrellus) in a West African rainforest with the description of a new species. Zoological Journal of the Linnean Society 167: 191–207
Nycticebus kayan	Primates	Munds, Nekaris & Ford	2013	Indonesia (Kalimantan), Malaysia (Sabah, Sarawak)	Munds, R.A., Nekaris, K.A.I. & Ford, S.M. 2013. Taxonomy of the bornean slow loris, with new species Nycticebus kayan (Primates, Lorisidae). American Journal of Primatology 75: 46–56
Petaurista siangensis	Rodentia	Choudhury	2013	India (NE India)	Choudhury, A.U. 2013. Description of a new species of giant flying squirrel of the genus Petaurista Link, 1795 from Siang Basin, Arunachal Pradesh in North East India. The Newsletter & Journal of the Rhino Foundation for nat. in NE India 9: 30–38, plates.
Rhinolophus kahuzi	Chiroptera	Fahr & Kerbis Peterhans	2013	Congo (Dem.Rep.)	Kerbis Peterhans, J.C., Fahr, J., Huhndorf, M.H., Kaleme, P., Plumptre, A.J., Marks, B.D. & Kizungu, R. 2013. Bats (Chiroptera) from the Albertine Rift, eastern Democratic Republic of Congo, with the description of two new species of the Rhinolophus maclaudi group. Bonn Zoological Bulletin 62: 186–202
Rhinolophus willardi	Chiroptera	Kerbis Peterhans & Fahr	2013	Congo (Dem.Rep.)	Kerbis Peterhans, J.C., Fahr, J., Huhndorf, M.H., Kaleme, P., Plumptre, A.J., Marks, B.D. & Kizungu, R. 2013. Bats (Chiroptera) from the Albertine Rift, eastern Democratic Republic of Congo, with the description of two new species of the Rhinolophus maclaudi group. Bonn Zoological Bulletin 62: 186–202
Sciurocheirus makandensis	Primates	Ambrose	2013	Gabon	Ambrose, L. 2013. Sciurocheirus makandensis sp. nov. Mammals of Africa. Volume 3: Primates (1st ed.): 421–422
Scutisorex thori	Eulipotyphla	Stanley, Malekani & Gambalemoke	2013	Congo (Dem.Rep.)	Stanley, W.T., Robbins, L.W., Malekani, J.M., Gambalemoke Mbalitini, S., Akaibe Migurimu, D., Mukinzi, J.C., Hulselmans, J., Prévot, V., Verheyen, E., Hutterer, R., Doty, J.B., Monroe, B.P., Nakazawa, Y.J., Braden, Z., Carroll, D., Kerbis Peterhans, J.C., Bates, J.M. & Esselstyn, J.A. 2013. A new hero emerges: another exceptional mammalian spine and its potential adaptive significance. Biology Letters 9: 20130486: 1–5
Tapirus kabomani	Perissodactyla	Cozzuol, Clozato, Holanda, Rodrigues, Nienow, de Thoisy, Redondo & Santos	2013	Brazil (Amazonas, Mato Grosso, Rondonia), Colombia	Cozzuol, M.A., Clozato, C.L., Holanda, E.C., Rodrigues, F.H.G., Nienow, S., de Thoisy, B., Redondo, R.A.F. & Santos, F.R. 2013. A new species of tapir from the Amazon. Journal of Mammalogy 94 (6): 1331–1345
Thomomys nayarensis	Rodentia	Mathis, M.Hafner, D.Hafner & Demastes	2013	Mexico (Nayarit)	Mathis, V.L., Hafner, M.S., Hafner, D.J. & Demastes, J.W. 2013. Thomomys nayarensis, a new species of pocket gopher from the Sierra del Nayar, Nayarit, Mexico. Journal of Mammalogy 94 (5): 983–994
Uropsilus aequodonenia	Eulipotyphla	Liu, Liu, Sun, Guo, Fan & Murphy	2013	China (Sichuan)	LIU Yang; LIU Shaoying; SUN Zhiyu; GUO Peng; FAN Zhenxin; Robert W Murphy (2013). "A new species of Uropsilus (Talpidae: Uropsilinae) from Sichuan, China". Acta Theriologica Sinica. 33 (2): 113–122.
Antechinus arktos	Dasyuromorphia	Baker, Mutton, Hines & van Dyck	2014	Australia (New South Wales, Queensland)	Baker, A.M., Mutton, T.Y., Hines, H.B. & van Dyck, S. 2014. The Black-tailed Antechinus, Antechinus arktos sp. nov.: a new species of carnivorous marsupial from montane regions of the Tweed Volcano caldera, eastern Australia. Zootaxa 3765: 100–133
Apomys iridensis	Rodentia	Heaney, Balete, Veluz, Steppan, Esselstyn, Pfeiffer & Rickart	2014	Philippines (Luzon)	Heaney, L.R. Balete, D.S., Veluz, M.J., Steppan, S.J., Esselstyn, J.A., Pfeiffer, A.W. & Rickart, E.A. 2014. Two new species of Philippine forest mice (Apomys, Muridae, Rodentia) from Lubang and Luzon Islands, with a redescription of Apomys sacobianus Johnson, 1962. Proceedings of the Biological Society of Washington 126: 395–413
Apomys lubangensis	Rodentia	Heaney, Balete, Veluz, Steppan, Esselstyn, Pfeiffer & Rickart	2014	Philippines (Lubang)	Heaney, L.R. Balete, D.S., Veluz, M.J., Steppan, S.J., Esselstyn, J.A., Pfeiffer, A.W. & Rickart, E.A. 2014. Two new species of Philippine forest mice (Apomys, Muridae, Rodentia) from Lubang and Luzon Islands, with a redescription of Apomys sacobianus Johnson, 1962. Proceedings of the Biological Society of Washington 126: 395–413
Bunomys karokophilus	Rodentia	Musser	2014	Indonesia	Musser, G. (2014). "A systematic review of Sulawesi Bunomys (Muridae, Murinae) with the description of two new species". Bulletin of the American Museum of Natural History. 392: 1–313. doi:10.1206/863.1. hdl:2246/6571. S2CID 83736022.
Bunomys torajae	Rodentia	Musser	2014	Indonesia	Musser, G. (2014). "A systematic review of Sulawesi Bunomys (Muridae, Murinae) with the description of two new species". Bulletin of the American Museum of Natural History. 392: 1–313. doi:10.1206/863.1. hdl:2246/6571. S2CID 83736022.
Calassomys apicalis	Rodentia	Pardiñas, Lessa, Teta, Salazar-Bravo & Câmara	2014	Brazil (Minas Gerais)	Pardiñas, U.F.J., Lessa, G., Teta, P., Salazar-Bravo, J. & Câmara, E.M.V.C. 2014. An integrative appraisal of the diversification in the Atlantic forest genus Delomys (Rodentia: Cricetidae: Sigmodontinae) with the description of a new species. Journal of Mammalogy 95: 201–215
Callicebus miltoni	Primates	Dalponte, Silva & Silva Júnior	2014	Brazil (Amazonas, Mato Grosso)	Dalponte, J.C., Silva, F.E. & Silva Júnior, J.S. 2014. New species of titi monkey, genus Callicebus Thomas, 1903 (Primates, Pitheciidae), from Southern Amazonia, Brazil. Papéis Avulsos de Zoologia, São Paulo 54: 457–472
Casinycteris campomaanensis	Chiroptera	Hassanin	2014	Cameroon	Hassanin, A. 2014. Description of a new bat species of the tribe Scotonycterini (Chiroptera, Pteropodidae) from southwestern Cameroon. Comptes Rendus Biologies 337: 134–142
Cerradomys akroai	Rodentia	Bonvicino, Casado & Weksler	2014	Brazil	Bonvicino, C.; Casado, F.; Weksler, M. (2014). "A new species of Cerradomys (Mammalia: Rodentia: Cricetidae) from Central Brazil, with remarks on the taxonomy of the genus". Zoologia. 31 (6): 525–540. doi:10.1590/S1984-46702014000600002.
Chiromyscus thomasi	Rodentia	Balakirev, Abramov & Rozhnov	2014	Laos, Vietnam	Balakirev, A.E., Abramov, A.V. & Rozhnov, V.V. 2014. Phylogenetic relationships in the Niviventer-Chiromyscus complex (Rodentia, Muridae) inferred from molecular data, with description of a new species. ZooKeys 451: 109–136
Crocidura absconditus	Eulipotyphla	Esselstyn, Achmadi & Maharadatunkamsi	2014	Indonesia (Java)	Esselstyn, J.A., Achmadi, A.S. & Maharadatunkamsi. 2014. A new species of shrew (Soricomorpha: Crocidura) from West Java, Indonesia. Journal of Mammalogy 95: 216–224
Cryptotis lacandonensis	Eulipotyphla	Guevara, Sánchez-Cordero, León-Paniagua & Woodman	2014	Mexico (Chiapas)	Guevara, L., Sánchez-Cordero, V., León-Paniagua, L. & Woodman, N. 2014. A new species of small-eared shrew (Mammalia, Eulipotyphla, Cryptotis) from the Lacandona rain forest, Mexico. Journal of Mammalogy 95: 739–753
Cryptotis niausa	Eulipotyphla	Cárdenas & Albuja	2014	Ecuador	Moreno Cárdenas, P.A.; Albuja V., L. (2014). "Una nueva especie de Musaraña del género Cryptotis Pomel 1848 (Mammalia: Soricomorpha: Soricidae) de Ecuador y estatus taxonomico de Cryptotis equatoris Thomas (1912)". Papéis Avulsos de Zoologia. 54 (28): 403–418. doi:10.1590/0031-1049.2014.54.28.
Ctenomys andersoni	Rodentia	Gardner, Salazar Bravo & Cook	2014	Bolivia	Gardner, S.L., Salazar Bravo, J. & Cook, J.A. 2014. New Species of Ctenomys Blainville 1826 (Rodentia: Ctenomyidae) from the Lowlands and Central Valleys of Bolivia. Special Publications, Museum of Texas Tech University 62: 1–34
Ctenomys erikacuellarae	Rodentia	Gardner, Salazar Bravo & Cook	2014	Bolivia	Gardner, S.L., Salazar Bravo, J. & Cook, J.A. 2014. New Species of Ctenomys Blainville 1826 (Rodentia: Ctenomyidae) from the Lowlands and Central Valleys of Bolivia. Special Publications, Museum of Texas Tech University 62: 1–34
Ctenomys lessai	Rodentia	Gardner, Salazar Bravo & Cook	2014	Bolivia	Gardner, S.L., Salazar Bravo, J. & Cook, J.A. 2014. New Species of Ctenomys Blainville 1826 (Rodentia: Ctenomyidae) from the Lowlands and Central Valleys of Bolivia. Special Publications, Museum of Texas Tech University 62: 1–34
Ctenomys yatesi	Rodentia	Gardner, Salazar Bravo & Cook	2014	Bolivia	Gardner, S.L., Salazar Bravo, J. & Cook, J.A. 2014. New Species of Ctenomys Blainville 1826 (Rodentia: Ctenomyidae) from the Lowlands and Central Valleys of Bolivia. Special Publications, Museum of Texas Tech University 62: 1–34
Delomys altimontanus	Rodentia	Gonçalves & de Oliveira	2014	Brazil	Gonçalves, P.R. & de Oliveira, J.A. 2014. An integrative appraisal of the diversification in the Atlantic forest genus Delomys (Rodentia: Cricetidae: Sigmodontinae) with the description of a new species. Zootaxa 3760: 001–038
Eumops chiribaya	Chiroptera	Medina, Gregorin, Zeballos, Zamora & Moras	2014	Peru	Medina, C.E., Gregorin, R., Zeballos, H., Zamora, H.T. & Moras, L.M. 2014. A new species of Eumops (Chiroptera: Molossidae) from southwestern Peru. Zootaxa 3878: 19–36
Hylomyscus kerbispeterhansi	Rodentia	Demos, Agwanda & Hickerson	2014	Kenya	Demos, T.C., Agwanda, B. & Hickerson, M.J. 2014. Integrative taxonomy within the Hylomyscus denniae complex (Rodentia: Muridae) and a new species from Kenya. Journal of Mammalogy 95: E1-E15
Hypsugo dolichodon	Chiroptera	Görföl, Csorba, Eger, Son & Francis	2014	Laos and Vietnam	Görföl, T.; Csorba, G.; Eger, J.L.; Son, N.T.; Francis, C.M. (2014). Canines make the difference: a new species of Hypsugo (Chiroptera: Vespertilionidae) from Laos and Vietnam. Zootaxa 3887 (2): 239–250
Inia araguaiaensis	Cetacea	Hrbek, Farias, Dutra & da Silva	2014	Brazil (Goias, Mato Grosso, Tocantins)	Hrbek, T., da Silva, V.M.F., Dutra, N., Gravena, W., Martin, A.R. & Farias, I.P. 2014. A New Species of River Dolphin from Brazil or: How Little Do We Know Our Biodiversity. PLoS ONE 83623: 1–12
Lutreolina massoia	Didelphimorphia	Martínez-Lanfranco, Flores, Jayat & D'Elía	2014	Argentina (Jujuy, Salta, Tucuman), Bolivia	Martínez-Lanfranco, J.A., Flores, D., Jayat, J.P. & D'Elía, G. 2014. A new species of lutrine opossum, genus Lutreolina Thomas (Didelphidae), from the South American Yungas. Journal of Mammalogy 95: 225–240
Macroscelides micus	Macroscelidea	Dumbacher & Rathbun	2014	Namibia	Dumbacher, J.P., Rathbun, G.B., Osborne, T.O., Griffin, M. & Eiseb, S.J. 2014. Journal of Mammalogy 95: 443–454
Miniopterus maghrebensis	Chiroptera	Puechmaille, Allegrini, Benda, Bilgin, Ibañez & Juste	2014	Morocco, Tunisia	Puechmaille, S.J., Allegrini, B., Benda, P., Gürün, K., Šrámek, J., Ibañez, C., Juste, J. & Bilgin, R. 2014. A new species of the Miniopterus schreibersii species complex (Chiroptera: Miniopteridae) from the Maghreb Region, North Africa. Zootaxa 3794: 108–124
Mormopterus halli	Chiroptera	Reardon, McKenzie & Adams	2014	Australia	Reardon, T.B.; McKenzie, N.L.; Cooper, S.J>B.; Appleto, B.; Carthew, S.; Adams, M. (2014). "A molecular and morphological investigation of species boundaries and phylogenetic relationships in Australian free-tailed bats Mormopterus (Chiroptera: Molossidae)". Australian Journal of Zoology. 62 (2): 109–136. doi:10.1071/ZO13082. hdl:10536/DRO/DU:30070309.
Mormopterus kitcheneri	Chiroptera	Reardon, McKenzie & Adams	2014	Australia	Reardon, T.B.; McKenzie, N.L.; Cooper, S.J>B.; Appleto, B.; Carthew, S.; Adams, M. (2014). "A molecular and morphological investigation of species boundaries and phylogenetic relationships in Australian free-tailed bats Mormopterus (Chiroptera: Molossidae)". Australian Journal of Zoology. 62 (2): 109–136. doi:10.1071/ZO13082. hdl:10536/DRO/DU:30070309.
Mormopterus lumsdenae	Chiroptera	Reardon, McKenzie & Adams	2014	Australia	Reardon, T.B.; McKenzie, N.L.; Cooper, S.J>B.; Appleto, B.; Carthew, S.; Adams, M. (2014). "A molecular and morphological investigation of species boundaries and phylogenetic relationships in Australian free-tailed bats Mormopterus (Chiroptera: Molossidae)". Australian Journal of Zoology. 62 (2): 109–136. doi:10.1071/ZO13082. hdl:10536/DRO/DU:30070309.
Musseromys anacuao	Rodentia	Heaney, Balete, Rickart, Veluz & Jansa	2014	Philippines (Luzon)	Heaney, L.R., Balete, D.S., Rickart, E.A., Veluz, M.J. & Jansa, S.A. 2014. Three New Species of Musseromys (Muridae, Rodentia), the Endemic Philippine Tree Mouse from Luzon Island. American Museum Novitates 3802: 1–27
Musseromys beneficus	Rodentia	Heaney, Balete, Rickart, Veluz & Jansa	2014	Philippines (Luzon)	Heaney, L.R., Balete, D.S., Rickart, E.A., Veluz, M.J. & Jansa, S.A. 2014. Three New Species of Musseromys (Muridae, Rodentia), the Endemic Philippine Tree Mouse from Luzon Island. American Museum Novitates 3802: 1–27
Musseromys inopinatus	Rodentia	Heaney, Balete, Rickart, Veluz & Jansa	2014	Philippines (Luzon)	Heaney, L.R., Balete, D.S., Rickart, E.A., Veluz, M.J. & Jansa, S.A. 2014. Three New Species of Musseromys (Muridae, Rodentia), the Endemic Philippine Tree Mouse from Luzon Island. American Museum Novitates 3802: 1–27
Myotis midastactus	Chiroptera	Moratelli & Wilson	2014	Bolivia	Moratelli, R. & Wilson, D.E. 2014. A new species of Myotis (Chiroptera, Vespertilionidae) from Bolivia. Journal of Mammalogy 95: E17-E25
Peromyscus carletoni	Rodentia	Bradley, Ordóñez-Garza, Sotero-Caio, Huynh, Kilpatrick, Iñiguez-Dávalos & Schmidly	2014	Mexico (Nayarit)	Bradley, R.D., Ordóñez-Garza, N., Sotero-Caio, C.G., Huynh, H.M., Kilpatrick, C.W., Iñiguez-Dávalos, L.I. & Schmidly, D.J. 2014. Morphometric, karyotypic, and molecular evidence for a new species of Peromyscus (Cricetidae: Neotominae) from Nayarit, Mexico. Journal of Mammalogy 95: 176–186
Phyllotis pearsoni	Rodentia	Pacheco, Rengifo & Vivas	2014	Peru	Pacheco, V., Rengifo, E.M. & Vivas, D. 2014. Una nueva especie de ratón orejón del género Phyllotis Waterhouse, 1837 (Rodentia: Cricetidae) del norte del Perú. Therya 5(2): 481–508
Pithecia cazuzai	Primates	Marsh	2014	Brazil (Amazonas)	Marsh, L.K. 2014. A taxonomic revision of the saki monkeys, Pithecia Desmarest, 1804. Neotropical Primates 21: 1–163
Pithecia isabela	Primates	Marsh	2014	Peru	Marsh, L.K. 2014. A taxonomic revision of the saki monkeys, Pithecia Desmarest, 1804. Neotropical Primates 21: 1–163
Pithecia mittermeieri	Primates	Marsh	2014	Brazil (Amazonas, Mato Grosso, Para, Rondonia)	Marsh, L.K. 2014. A taxonomic revision of the saki monkeys, Pithecia Desmarest, 1804. Neotropical Primates 21: 1–163
Pithecia pissinattii	Primates	Marsh	2014	Brazil (Amazonas, Para)	Marsh, L.K. 2014. A taxonomic revision of the saki monkeys, Pithecia Desmarest, 1804. Neotropical Primates 21: 1–163
Pithecia rylandsi	Primates	Marsh	2014	Bolivia, Peru	Marsh, L.K. 2014. A taxonomic revision of the saki monkeys, Pithecia Desmarest, 1804. Neotropical Primates 21: 1–163
Platyrrhinus guianensis	Chiroptera	Velazco & Lim	2014	Guyana, Suriname	Velazco, P.M. & Lim, B.K. 2014. A new species of broad-nosed bat Platyrrhinus Saussure, 1860 (Chiroptera: Phyllostomidae) from the Guianan Shield. Zootaxa 3796: 175–193
Scapteromys meridionalis	Rodentia	Quintela, Gonçalves, Althoff, Sbalqueiro, Oliveira & Freitas	2014	Brazil (Parana, Santa Catarina)	Quintela, F.M., Gonçalves, G.L., Althoff, S.L., Sbalqueiro, I.J., Oliveira, L.F.B. & de Freitas, T.R.O. 2014. A new species of swamp rat of the genus Scapteromys Waterhouse, 1837 (Rodentia: Sigmodontinae) endemic to Araucaria angustifolia Forest in Southern Brazil. Zootaxa 3811: 207–225
Scotophilus andrewreborii	Chiroptera	Brooks & Bickham	2014	Kenya	Brooks, D.M. & Bickham, J.W. 2014. New Species of Scotophilus (Chiroptera: Vespertilionidae) from Sub-Saharan Africa. Occasional Papers, Museum of Texas Tech University 326: 1–21
Scotophilus ejetai	Chiroptera	Brooks & Bickham	2014	Ethiopia	Brooks, D.M. & Bickham, J.W. 2014. New Species of Scotophilus (Chiroptera: Vespertilionidae) from Sub-Saharan Africa. Occasional Papers, Museum of Texas Tech University 326: 1–21
Scotophilus livingstonii	Chiroptera	Brooks & Bickham	2014	Ghana, Kenya	Brooks, D.M. & Bickham, J.W. 2014. New Species of Scotophilus (Chiroptera: Vespertilionidae) from Sub-Saharan Africa. Occasional Papers, Museum of Texas Tech University 326: 1–21
Scotophilus trujilloi	Chiroptera	Brooks & Bickham	2014	Kenya	Brooks, D.M. & Bickham, J.W. 2014. New Species of Scotophilus (Chiroptera: Vespertilionidae) from Sub-Saharan Africa. Occasional Papers, Museum of Texas Tech University 326: 1–21
Sousa sahulensis	Cetacea	Jefferson & Rosenbaum	2014	Australia	Jefferson, T.A.; Rosenbaum, H.C. (2014). "Taxonomic revision of the humpback dolphins (Sousa spp.), and description of a new species from Australia". Marine Mammal Science. 30 (4): 1494–1541. doi:10.1111/mms.12152.
Sturnira bakeri	Chiroptera	Velazco & Patterson	2014	Ecuador	Velazco, P.M. & Patterson, B.D. 2014. Two new species of yellow-shouldered bats, genus Sturnira Gray, 1842 (Chiroptera, Phyllostomidae) from Costa Rica, Panama and western Ecuador. ZooKeys 402: 43–66
Sturnira burtonlimi	Chiroptera	Velazco & Patterson	2014	Costa Rica, Panama	Velazco, P.M. & Patterson, B.D. 2014. Two new species of yellow-shouldered bats, genus Sturnira Gray, 1842 (Chiroptera, Phyllostomidae) from Costa Rica, Panama and western Ecuador. ZooKeys 402: 43–66
Thyroptera wynneae	Chiroptera	Velazco, Gregorin, Voss & Simmons	2014	Brazil (Minas Gerais), Peru	Velazco, P.M., Gregorin, R., Voss, R.S. & Simmons, N.B. 2014. Extraordinary Local Diversity of Disk-winged Bats (Thyropteridae: Thyroptera) in Northeastern Peru, with the Description of a New Species and Comments on Roosting Behavior. American Museum Novitates 3795: 1–28
Tympanoctomys kirchnerorum	Rodentia	Teta, Pardiñas, Sauthier & Gallardo	2014	Argentina (Chubut)	Teta, P., Pardiñas, U.F.J., Sauthier, D.E.U. & Gallardo, M.H. 2014. A new species of the tetraploid vizcacha rat Tympanoctomys (Caviomorpha, Octodontidae) from central Patagonia, Argentina. Journal of Mammalogy 95: 60–71
Uroderma bakeri	Chiroptera	Mantilla-Meluk	2014	Colombia, Venezuela	Mantilla-Meluk, H. 2014. Defining Species and Species Boundaries in Uroderma (Chiroptera: Phyllostomidae) with a Description of a New Species. Occasional Papers, Museum of Texas Tech University 325: 1–25
Vampyressa elisabethae	Chiroptera	Tavares, Gardber, Ramírez-Chaves & Velazco	2014	Panama	Tavares, V., Gardner, A.L., Ramírez-Chaves, H.E. & Velazco, P.M. 2014. Systematics of Vampyressa melissa Thomas, 1926 (Chiroptera: Phyllostomidae), with descriptions of two new species of Vampyressa. American Museum Novitates 3813: 1–27
Vampyressa sinchi	Chiroptera	Tavares, Gardber, Ramírez-Chaves & Velazco	2014	Colombia	Tavares, V., Gardner, A.L., Ramírez-Chaves, H.E. & Velazco, P.M. 2014. Systematics of Vampyressa melissa Thomas, 1926 (Chiroptera: Phyllostomidae), with descriptions of two new species of Vampyressa. American Museum Novitates 3813: 1–27
Waiomys mamasae	Rodentia	Rowe, Achmadi & Esselstyn	2014	Indonesia (Sulawesi)	Rowe, K.C., Achmadi, A.S. & Esselstyn, J.A. 2014. Convergent evolution of aquatic foraging in a new genus and species (Rodentia: Muridae) from Sulawesi Island, Indonesia. Zootaxa 3815: 541–564
Abrothrix manni	Rodentia	D'Elía, Teta, Upham, Pardiñas & Patterson	2015	Argentina, Chile	D'Elía, Guillermo; Pablo Teta, Nathan S. Upham, Ulyses F. J. Pardiñas and Bruce D. Patterson (2015). "Description of a new soft-haired mouse, genus Abrothrix (Sigmodontinae), from the temperate Valdivian rainforest". Journal of Mammalogy. 96 (4): 839–853. doi:10.1093/jmammal/gyv103. hdl:11336/42547.
Agouti silvagarciae	Rodentia	Van Roosmalen & Van Hooft	2015	Brazil (Amazonas)	Van Roosmalen, M.G.M. 2015. Hotspot of new megafauna found in the Central Amazon (Brazil): the lower Rio Aripuanã Basin. Biodiversity Journal 6(1): 219–244
Antechinus vandycki	Dasyuromorphia	Baker, Mutton, Mason & Gray	2015	Australia (Tasmania)	Baker, A.M., Mutton, T.Y., Mason, E.D. & Gray, E.L. 2015. A taxonomic assessment of the Australian Dusky Antechinus Complex: a new species, the Tasman Peninsula Dusky Antechinus (Antechinus vandycki sp. nov.) and an elevation to species of the Mainland Dusky Antechinus (Antechinus swainsonii mimetes (Thomas)). Memoirs of the Queensland Museum – Nature 59: 75–126
Aselliscus dongbacanus	Chiroptera	Tu, Csorba, Görföl, Arai, Son, Thanh & Hassanin	2015	Vietnam	Vuong Tan Tu; Gábor Csorba; Tamás Görföl; Satoru Arai; Nguyen Truong Son; Hoang Trung Thanh; Alexandre Hassanin (2015). "Description of A New Species of the Genus Aselliscus (Chiroptera, Hipposideridae) from Vietnam" (PDF). Acta Chiropterologica. 17 (2): 233–254. doi:10.3161/15081109ACC2015.17.2.002. S2CID 87183273.
Batomys uragon	Rodentia	Balete, Rickart, Heaney & Jansa	2015	Philippines (Luzon)	Balete, D, S.; Rickart, E.A.; Heaney, L.R.; Jansa, S.A. (2015). "A new species of Batomys (Muridae, Rodentia) from southern Luzon Island, Philippines". Proceedings of the Biological Society of Washington. 128 (1): 22–39. doi:10.2988/0006-324X-128.1.22.
Callicebus urubambensis	Primates	Vermeer & Tello-Alvarado	2015	Peru	Jan Vermeer & Julio C. Tello-Alvarado (2015). "The Distribution and Taxonomy of Titi Monkeys (Callicebus) in Central and Southern Peru, with the Description of a New Species". Primate Conservation. 29: 1–21.
Calomys mattevii	Rodentia	Gurgel-Filho, Feijó & Langguth	2015	Brazil	Gurgel-Filho, M.N.; Feijó, A.; Langguth, A. (2015). "Pequenos mamíferos do Ceará (Marsupias, morcegos e roedores sigmodontíneos) com discussão taxonômica de algumas espécies". Revista Nordestina de Biologia. 23 (2): 3–150.
Cheirogaleus andysabini	Primates	Lei, McLain, Frasier, Taylor, Bailey, Engberg, Ginter, Nash, Randriamampionona, Groves, Mittermeier & Louis Jr.	2015	Madagascar	Lei, R.; McLain, A. T.; Frasier, C. L.; Taylor, J. M.; Bailey, C. A.; Engberg, S. E.; Ginter, A. L.; Nash, S. D.; Randriamampionona, R.; Groves, C. P.; Mittermeier, R. A.; Louis, E. E. Jr. (2015). "A New Species in the Genus Cheirogaleus (Cheirogaleidae)". Primate Conservation. 29 (2): 1–12. doi:10.1896/052.029.0103.
Crocidura fingui	Eulipotyphla	Ceriaco, Marques, Jacquet, Nicolas, Colyn & Denys	2015	São Tomé and Príncipe	Ceríaco, L.M.P.; Marques, M.P.; Jacquet, F.; Nicolas, V.; Colyn, M.; Denys, C. (2015). "Description of a new endemic species of shrew (Mammalia, Soricomorpha) from Príncipe Island (Gulf of Guinea)". Mammalia. 79 (3). doi:10.1515/mammalia-2014-0056. S2CID 84497310.
Crocidura mdumai	Eulipotyphla	Stanley, Hutterer, Giarla & Esselstyn	2015	Tanzania	Stanley, W.T., Hutterer, R., Giarla, T.C. & Esselstyn, J.A. (2015). "Phylogeny, phylogeography and geographical variation in the Crocidura monax (Soricidae) species complex from the montane islands of Tanzania, with descriptions of three new species". Zoological Journal of the Linnean Society. 174: 185–215. doi:10.1111/zoj.12230.
Crocidura munissii	Eulipotyphla	Stanley, Hutterer, Giarla & Esselstyn	2015	Tanzania	Stanley, W.T., Hutterer, R., Giarla, T.C. & Esselstyn, J.A. (2015). "Phylogeny, phylogeography and geographical variation in the Crocidura monax (Soricidae) species complex from the montane islands of Tanzania, with descriptions of three new species". Zoological Journal of the Linnean Society. 174: 185–215. doi:10.1111/zoj.12230.
Crocidura newmarki	Eulipotyphla	Stanley, Hutterer, Giarla & Esselstyn	2015	Tanzania	Stanley, W.T., Hutterer, R., Giarla, T.C. & Esselstyn, J.A. (2015). "Phylogeny, phylogeography and geographical variation in the Crocidura monax (Soricidae) species complex from the montane islands of Tanzania, with descriptions of three new species". Zoological Journal of the Linnean Society. 174: 185–215. doi:10.1111/zoj.12230.
Cryptotis cavatorculus	Eulipotyphla	Woodman	2015	Honduras	Woodman, N. (2015). "Morphological Variation among Broad-Clawed Shrews (Mammalia: Eulipotyphla: Soricidae: Cryptotis Pomel, 1848) from Highlands of Western Honduras, with Descriptions of Three New Cryptic Species". Annals of Carnegie Museum. 83 (2): 95–119. doi:10.2992/007.083.0203. S2CID 86198054.
Cryptotis celaque	Eulipotyphla	Woodman	2015	Honduras	Woodman, N. (2015). "Morphological Variation among Broad-Clawed Shrews (Mammalia: Eulipotyphla: Soricidae: Cryptotis Pomel, 1848) from Highlands of Western Honduras, with Descriptions of Three New Cryptic Species". Annals of Carnegie Museum. 83 (2): 95–119. doi:10.2992/007.083.0203. S2CID 86198054.
Cryptotis perijensis	Eulipotyphla	Quiroga-Carmona & Woodman	2015	Colombia, Venezuela	Quiroga-Carmona, M.; Woodman, N. (2015). "A new species of Cryptotis (Mammalia, Eulipotyphla, Soricidae) from the Sierra de Perijá, Venezuelan-Colombian Andes". Journal of Mammalogy. 96 (4): 800–809. doi:10.1093/jmammal/gyv085.
Cryptotis mccarthyi	Eulipotyphla	Woodman	2015	Honduras	Woodman, N. (2015). "Morphological Variation among Broad-Clawed Shrews (Mammalia: Eulipotyphla: Soricidae: Cryptotis Pomel, 1848) from Highlands of Western Honduras, with Descriptions of Three New Cryptic Species". Annals of Carnegie Museum. 83 (2): 95–119. doi:10.2992/007.083.0203. S2CID 86198054.
Eudiscoderma thongareeae	Chiroptera	Soisook, Prajakjitr, Karapan, Francis & Bates	2015	Thailand	Soisook, P., Prajakjitr, A., Karapan, S., Francis, C.M. & Bates, P.J.J. (2015). "A new genus and species of false vampire (Chiroptera: Megadermatidae) from peninsular Thailand". Zootaxa. 3931 (1): 528–550. doi:10.11646/zootaxa.3931.4.4. PMID 25781844. S2CID 32517431.
Glischropus aquilus	Chiroptera	Csorba, Gorfol, Wiantoro, Kingston, Bates & Huang	2015	Indonesia (Sumatra)	Csorba, G., Gorfol, T., Wiantoro, S., Kingston, T., Bates, P.J.J. & Huang, J.C.-C. (2015). "Thumb-pads up – a new species of thick-thumbed bat from Sumatra (Chiroptera: Vespertilionidae: Glischropus)" (PDF). Zootaxa. 3980 (2): 267–278. doi:10.11646/zootaxa.3980.2.7. PMID 26249952.
Histiotus diaphanopterus	Chiroptera	Feijó, da Rocha & Althoff	2015	Bolivia, Brazil (Bahia, Ceará, Maranhão, Paraiba)	Feijó, A., da Rocha, P.A. & Althoff, S.L. (2015). "New species of Histiotus (Chiroptera: Vespertilionidae) from northeastern Brazil". Zootaxa. 4048 (3): 412–427. doi:10.11646/zootaxa.4048.3.4. PMID 26624755. S2CID 25843526.
Hylomyscus heinrichorum	Rodentia	Carleton, Banasiak & Stanley	2015	Angola	Carleton, M.D.; Banasiak, R.A.; Stanley, W.T. (2015). "A new species of the rodent genus Hylomyscus from Angola, with a distributional summary of the H. anselli species group (Muridae: Murinae: Praomyini)". Zootaxa. 4040 (2): 101–128. doi:10.11646/zootaxa.4040.2.1. PMID 26624655.
Hyorhinomys stuempkei	Rodentia	Esselstyn, Achmadi, Handika & Rowe	2015	Indonesia (Sulawesi)	Esselstyn, J.A., Achmadi, A.S., Handika, H. & Rowe, K.C. (2015). "A hog-nosed shrew rat (Rodentia: Muridae) from Sulawesi Island, Indonesia". Journal of Mammalogy. 96 (5): 895–907. doi:10.1093/jmammal/gyv093.
Hypsugo bemainty	Chiroptera	Goodman, Rakotondramanana, Ramasindrazana, Kearney, Monadjem, Schoeman, Taylor, Naughton & Appleton	2015	Madagascar	Goodman, S.M.; Rakotondramanana, C.F.; Ramasindrazana, B.; Kearney, T.; Monadjem, A.; Schoeman, M.C.; Taylor, P.J.; Naughton, K.; Appleton, B. (2015). "An integrative approach to characterize Malagasy bats of the subfamily Vespertilioninae Gray, 1821, with the description of a new species of Hypsugo". Zoological Journal of the Linnean Society. 173 (4): 988–1018. doi:10.1111/zoj.12223. hdl:2263/51078.
Lenomys grovesi	Rodentia	Musser	2015	Indonesia (Sulawesi)	Musser, G.G. (2015). "Characterisation of the endemic Sulawesi Lenomys meyeri (Muridae, Murinae) and the description of a new species of Lenomys". In Behie, A.M.; Oxenham, M.F. (eds.). Taxonomic Tapestries: The Threads of Evolutionary, Behavioural and Conservation Research. Canberra: ANU Press. pp. 14–50.
Lonchophylla inexpectata	Chiroptera	Moratelli & Dias	2015	Brazil (Bahia, Pernambuco)	Moratelli, R.; Dias, D. (2015). "A new species of nectar-feeding bat, genus Lonchophylla, from the Caatinga of Brazil (Chiroptera, Phyllostomidae)". ZooKeys (514): 73–91. doi:10.3897/zookeys.514.10013. PMC 4525025. PMID 26261433.
Macaca leucogenys	Primates	Li, Zhao & Fan	2015	China (Xizang)	Li, C.; Zhao, C.; Fan, P.F. (2015). "White-cheeked macaque (Macaca leucogenys): A new macaque species from Modog, southeastern Tibet". American Journal of Primatology. 77 (7): 753–766. doi:10.1002/ajp.22394. PMID 25809642. S2CID 31188818.
Mazama tienhoveni	Artiodactyla	Van Roosmalen & Van Hooft	2015	Brazil (Amazonas)	Van Roosmalen, M.G.M. 2015. Hotspot of new megafauna found in the Central Amazon (Brazil): the lower Rio Aripuanã Basin. Biodiversity Journal 6(1): 219–244
Miniopterus ambohitrensis	Chiroptera	Goodman, Ramasindrazana, Naughton & Appleton	2015	Madagascar	Goodman, S.M., Ramasindrazana, B., Naughton, K.M. & Appleton, B. (2015). "Description of a new species of the Miniopterus aelleni group (Chiroptera: Miniopteridae) from upland areas of central and northern Madagascar". Zootaxa. 3936 (4): 538–558. doi:10.11646/zootaxa.3936.4.4. PMID 25947452. S2CID 21361578.
Monodelphis pinocchio	Didelphimorphia	Pavan	2015	Brazil (Espirito Santo, Minas Gerais, Rio de Janeiro, São Paulo)	Pavan, S.E. (2015). "A new species of Monodelphis (Didelphimorphia, Didelphidae) from the Brazilian Atlantic Forest". American Museum Novitates (3832): 1–15. doi:10.1206/3832.1. hdl:2246/6587. S2CID 86722288.
Murina kontumensis	Chiroptera	Son, Csorba, Tu & Motokawa	2015	Vietnam	Nguyen Truong Son; Gabor Csorba; Vuong Tan Tu; Vu Dinh Thong; Yi Wu; Masashi Harada; Tatsuo Oshida; Hideki Endo; Masaharu Motokawa (2015). "A New Species of the Genus Murina (Chiroptera: Vespertilionidae) from the Central Highlands of Vietnam with a Review of the Subfamily Murininae in Vietnam". Acta Chiropterologica. 17 (2): 201–232. doi:10.3161/15081109acc2015.17.2.001. S2CID 87256295.
Myotis secundus	Chiroptera	Ruedi, Csorba, Lin & Chou	2015	Taiwan	Ruedi, M., Csorba, G., Lin, L.-K. & Chou, C.-H. (2015). "Molecular phylogeny and morphological revision of Myotis bats (Chiroptera: Vespertilionidae) from Taiwan and adjacent China". Zootaxa. 3920 (1): 301–342. doi:10.11646/zootaxa.3920.2.
Myotis soror	Chiroptera	Ruedi, Csorba, Lin & Chou	2015	Taiwan	Ruedi, M., Csorba, G., Lin, L.-K. & Chou, C.-H. (2015). "Molecular phylogeny and morphological revision of Myotis bats (Chiroptera: Vespertilionidae) from Taiwan and adjacent China". Zootaxa. 3920 (1): 301–342. doi:10.11646/zootaxa.3920.2.
Neoromicia isabella	Chiroptera	Decher, Hoffman, Schaer, Norris, Kadjo, Astrin, Monadjem & Hutterer	2015	Guinea	Jan Decher; Anke Hoffmann; Juliane Schaer; Ryan W. Norris; Blaise Kadjo; Jonas Astrin; Ara Monadjem; Rainer Hutterer (2015). "Bat Diversity in the Simandou Mountain Range of Guinea, with the Description of a New White-Winged Vespertilionid". Acta Chiropterologica. 17 (2): 255–282. doi:10.3161/15081109acc2015.17.2.003. S2CID 87921239.
Neusticomys vossi	Rodentia	Hanson, D'Elía, Ayers, Cox, Burneo & Lee Jr.	2015	Ecuador	Hanson, J.D.; D'Elía, G.; Ayers, S.B.; Cox, S.B.; Burneo, S.F.; Lee Jr., T.E. (2015). "A new species of fish-eating rat, genus Neusticomys (Sigmodontinae), from Ecuador". Zoological Studies. 59 (49): 1–11. doi:10.1186/s40555-015-0126-7. PMC 6661509. PMID 31966136.
Otomops harrissoni	Chiroptera	Ralph, Richards, Taylor, Napier & Lamb	2015	Yemen, Eritrea, Ethiopia, Kenya	Ralph, M.C.; Richards, L.R.; Taylor, P.J.; Napier, M.C.; Lamb, J.M. (2015). "Revision of Afro-Malagasy Otomops (Chiroptera: Molossidae) with the description of a new Afro-Arabian species". Zootaxa. 4057 (1): 1–49. doi:10.11646/zootaxa.4057.1.1. hdl:10019.1/111745. PMID 26701463. S2CID 293129.
Phyllotis occidens	Rodentia	Rengifo & Pacheco	2015	Peru	Rengifo, E.M. & Pacheco, V. (2015). "Taxonomic revision of the Andean leaf-eared mouse, Phyllotis andium Thomas 1912 (Rodentia: Cricetidae), with the description of a new species". Zootaxa. 4018 (3): 349–380. doi:10.11646/zootaxa.4018.3.2. PMID 26624045. S2CID 25512998.
Rhinolophus francisi	Chiroptera	Soisook, Struebig, Bates & Miguez	2015	Indonesia (Kalimantan), Malaysia (Sabah), Thailand	Soisook P; Struebig M; Noerfahmy S; Bernard H; Maryanto I; Chen SF; Rossiter SJ; Kuo HC; Deshpande K; Bates PJJ; Sykes D; Miguez RP (2015). "Description of a new species of the Rhinolophus trifoliatus-group (Chiroptera: Rhinolophidae) from Southeast Asia". Acta Chiropterologica. 17 (1): 21–36. doi:10.3161/15081109ACC2015.17.1.002. S2CID 83470278.
Rhinolophus luctoides	Chiroptera	Volleth, Loidl, Mayer, Yong, Müller & Heller	2015	Malaysia (peninsular)	Volleth, M.; Loidl, J.; ç Mayer, F.; Yong, H.-S.; Müller, S.; Heller, K.-G. (2015). "Surprising Genetic Diversity in Rhinolophus luctus (Chiroptera: Rhinolophidae) from Peninsular Malaysia: Description of a New Species Based on Genetic and Morphological Characters". Acta Chiropterologica. 17 (1): 1–20. doi:10.3161/15081109ACC2015.17.1.001. S2CID 86009452.
Trichechus pygmaeus	Sirenia	Van Roosmalen & Van der Vlist	2015	Brazil (Amazonas)	Van Roosmalen, M.G.M. 2015. Hotspot of new megafauna found in the Central Amazon (Brazil): the lower Rio Aripuanã Basin. Biodiversity Journal 6(1): 219–244
Cryptotis dinirensis	Eulipotyphla	Quiroga-Carmona & Nascimiento	2016	Venezuela	Quiroga-Carmona, M.; Nascimiento, C. (2016). "A new species of small-eared shrew of the genus Cryptotis Pomel, 1848 (Mammalia, Eulipotyphla, Soricidae) from the easternmost mountains of the Venezuelan Andes". Mammalian Biology. 81 (5): 494–505. doi:10.1016/j.mambio.2016.04.002.
Dromiciops bozinovici	Microbiotheria	D'Elía, Hurtado & D'Anatro	2016	Chile	D'Elía, G.; Hurtado, N.; D'Anatro, A. (2016). "Alpha taxonomy of Dromiciops (Microbiotheriidae) with the description of 2 new species of monito del monte". Journal of Mammalogy. 97 (4): 1136–1152. doi:10.1093/jmammal/gyw068.
Dromiciops mondaca	Microbiotheria	D'Elía, Hurtado & D'Anatro	2016	Chile	D'Elía, G.; Hurtado, N.; D'Anatro, A. (2016). "Alpha taxonomy of Dromiciops (Microbiotheriidae) with the description of 2 new species of monito del monte". Journal of Mammalogy. 97 (4): 1136–1152. doi:10.1093/jmammal/gyw068.
Eumops chimaera	Chiroptera	Gregorin, Moras, Acosta, Vasconcellos, Poma, Santos & Paca	2016	Brazil & Bolivia	Renato Gregorin; Ligiane Martins Moras; Luis Hernán Acosta; Karina Lobão Vasconcellos; José Luis Poma; Fabrício Rodrigues dos Santos; Roberto Carlos Paca (2016). "A new species of Eumops (Chiroptera: Molossidae) from southeastern Brazil and Bolivia". Mammalian Biology. 81 (3): 235–246. doi:10.1016/j.mambio.2016.01.002.
Gracilimus radix	Rodentia	Rowe, Achmadi & Esselstyn	2016	Indonesia (Sulawesi)	Kevin C. Rowe; Anang S. Achmadi; Jacob A. Esselstyn (2016). "A new genus and species of omnivorous rodent (Muridae: Murinae) from Sulawesi, nested within a clade of endemic carnivores". Journal of Mammalogy. 97 (3): 978–991. doi:10.1093/jmammal/gyw029.
Hipposideros cryptovalorona	Chiroptera	Goodman, Schoeman, Rakotoarivelo & Willons-Munro	2016	Madagascar	Goodman, S.M.; Schoeman, M.C.; Rakotoarivelo, A.; Willows-Munro, S. (2016). "How many species of Hipposideros have occurred on Madagascar since the Late Pleistocene?". Zoological Journal of the Linnean Society. 177 (2): 428–449. doi:10.1111/zoj.12368.
Juliomys ximenezi	Rodentia	Christoff, Vieira, Oliveira, Gonçalves, Valianti & Tomasi	2016	Brazil (Rio Grande do Sul)	Christoff, A.U.; Vieira, E.M.; Oliveira, L.R.; Gonçalves, J.W.; Valiati, V.H.; Tomasi, P.S. (2016). "A new species of Juliomys (Rodentia, Cricetidae, Sigmodontinae) from the Atlantic Forest of Southern Brazil". Journal of Mammalogy. 97 (5): 1469–1482. doi:10.1093/jmammal/gyw082.
Marmosops chucha	Didelphimorphia	Díaz-Nieto & Voss	2016	Colombia	Díaz-Nieto, J.F.; Voss, R.S. (2016). "A Revision of the Didelphid Marsupial Genus Marmosops, Part 1. Species of the Subgenus Sciophanes". Bulletin of the American Museum of Natural History. 402: 1–70. doi:10.1206/0003-0090-402.1.1. hdl:2246/6653. S2CID 88923233.
Marmosops magdalenae	Didelphimorphia	Díaz-Nieto & Voss	2016	Colombia	Díaz-Nieto, J.F.; Voss, R.S. (2016). "A Revision of the Didelphid Marsupial Genus Marmosops, Part 1. Species of the Subgenus Sciophanes". Bulletin of the American Museum of Natural History. 402: 1–70. doi:10.1206/0003-0090-402.1.1. hdl:2246/6653. S2CID 88923233.
Microcebus boraha	Primates	Hotaling, Foley, Lawrence, Bocanegra, Blanco, Rasoloarison, Kappeler, Barrett, Yoder & Weisrock	2016	Madagascar	Scott Hotaling; Mary E. Foley; Nicolette M. Lawrence; Jose Bocanegra; Marina B. Blanco; Rodin Rasoloarison; Peter M. Kappeler; Meredith A. Barrett; Anne D. Yoder; David W. Weisrock (2016). "Species discovery and validation in a cryptic radiation of endangered primates: coalescent-based species delimitation in Madagascar's mouse lemurs". Molecular Ecology. 25 (9): 2029–2045. doi:10.1111/mec.13604. PMID 26946180. S2CID 43912903.
Microcebus ganzhorni	Primates	Hotaling, Foley, Lawrence, Bocanegra, Blanco, Rasoloarison, Kappeler, Barrett, Yoder & Weisrock	2016	Madagascar	Scott Hotaling; Mary E. Foley; Nicolette M. Lawrence; Jose Bocanegra; Marina B. Blanco; Rodin Rasoloarison; Peter M. Kappeler; Meredith A. Barrett; Anne D. Yoder; David W. Weisrock (2016). "Species discovery and validation in a cryptic radiation of endangered primates: coalescent-based species delimitation in Madagascar's mouse lemurs". Molecular Ecology. 25 (9): 2029–2045. doi:10.1111/mec.13604. PMID 26946180. S2CID 43912903.
Microcebus manitatra	Primates	Hotaling, Foley, Lawrence, Bocanegra, Blanco, Rasoloarison, Kappeler, Barrett, Yoder & Weisrock	2016	Madagascar	Scott Hotaling; Mary E. Foley; Nicolette M. Lawrence; Jose Bocanegra; Marina B. Blanco; Rodin Rasoloarison; Peter M. Kappeler; Meredith A. Barrett; Anne D. Yoder; David W. Weisrock (2016). "Species discovery and validation in a cryptic radiation of endangered primates: coalescent-based species delimitation in Madagascar's mouse lemurs". Molecular Ecology. 25 (9): 2029–2045. doi:10.1111/mec.13604. PMID 26946180. S2CID 43912903.
Microtus elbeyli	Rodentia	Yigit, Çolak & Sözen	2016	Turkey	YİĞİT, N.; ÇOLAK, E.; SÖZEN, M. (2016). "A new species of voles, Microtus elbeyli sp. nov., from Turkey with taxonomic overview of social voles distributed in southeastern Anatolia". Turkish Journal of Zoology. 40: 73–79. doi:10.3906/zoo-1404-19.
Murina fanjiangshanensis	Chiroptera	He, Xiao & Zhou	2016	China (Guizhou)	Fang He, Ning Xiao; Jiang Zhou (2016). "A New Species of Murina from China (Chiroptera: Vespertilionidae)". Cave Research. 2 (2): 1–4.
Necromys lilloi	Rodentia	Jayat, D'Elía, Ortiz & Teta	2016	Argentina	J. Pablo Jayat; Guillermo D'Elía; Pablo E. Ortiz; Pablo Teta (2016). "A new species of the rodent genus Necromys Ameghino (Cricetidae: Sigmodontinae: Akodontini) from the Chaco Serrano grasslands of northwestern Argentina". Journal of Mammalogy. 97 (5): 1321–1335. doi:10.1093/jmammal/gyw103. hdl:11336/46327. S2CID 89296630.
Oecomys franciscorum	Rodentia	Pardiñas, Teta, Salazar-Bravo, Myers & Galliari	2016	Argentina, possibly Paraguay and Brazil	Ulyses F. J. Pardiñas; Pablo Teta; Jorge Salazar-Bravo; Phil Myers; Carlos A. Galliari (2016). "A new species of arboreal rat, genus Oecomys (Rodentia, Cricetidae) from Chaco". Journal of Mammalogy. 97 (4): 1177–1196. doi:10.1093/jmammal/gyw070. hdl:11336/36873.
Peromyscus gardneri	Rodentia	Lorenzo, Álvarez-Castañeda, Pérez-Consuegra & Patton	2016	Mexico	Consuelo Lorenzo; Sergio T. Álvarez-Castañeda; Sergio G. Pérez-Consuegra; James L. Patton (2016). "Revision of the Chiapan deer mouse, Peromyscus zarhynchus, with the description of a new species". Journal of Mammalogy. 97 (3): 910–918. doi:10.1093/jmammal/gyw018.
Rattus detentus	Rodentia	Timm, Weijola, Aplin, Flannery & Pine	2016	Papua New Guinea (Manus)	Robert M. Timm; Valter Weijola; Ken P. Aplin; Stephen C. Donnellan; Tim F. Flannery; Vicki Thomson; Ronald H. Pine (2016). "A new species of Rattus (Rodentia: Muridae) from Manus Island, Papua New Guinea". Journal of Mammalogy. 97 (3): 861–878. doi:10.1093/jmammal/gyw034. hdl:1808/20678.
Rhinolophus monticolus	Chiroptera	Soisook, Karapan, Srikrachang, Dejtaradol, Nualcharoen, Bumrungsri, Oo, Aung, Bates, Harutyunyan, Bús & Bogdanowicz	2016	Thailand and Laos	Soisook, P.; Karapan, S.; Srikrachang, M.; Dejtaradol, A.; Nualcharoen, K.; Bumrungsri, S.; Oo, S.S.L.; Aung, M.M.; Bates, P.J.J.; Harutyunyan, M.; Buś, M.M.; Bogdanowicz, W. (2016). "Hill Forest Dweller: A New Cryptic Species of Rhinolophus in the 'pusillus Group' (Chiroptera: Rhinolophidae) from Thailand and Lao PDR". Acta Chiropterologica. 18 (1): 117–139. doi:10.3161/15081109ACC2016.18.1.005. S2CID 89219702.
Crocidura umbra	Soricomorpha	Demos, Achmadi, Handika, Maharadatunkamsi, Rowe, Esselstyn	2017	Indonesia (Java)	Demos, T.C.; Achmadi, A.S.; Handika, H.; Maharadatunkamsi; Rowe, K.C.; Esselstyn, J.A. (2017). "A new species of shrew (Soricomorpha: Crocidura) from Java, Indonesia: possible character displacement despite interspecific gene flow". Journal of Mammalogy. 98 (1): 183–193. doi:10.1093/jmammal/gyw183.
Cryptotis monteverdensis	Soricomorpha	Woodman & Timm	2017	Costa Rica	Woodman, N.; Timm, R.M. (2017). "A new species of small-eared shrew in the Cryptotis thomasi species group from Costa Rica (Mammalia: Eulipotyphla: Soricidae)". Mammal Research. 62 (1): 89–101. doi:10.1007/s13364-016-0289-6. hdl:1808/23211. S2CID 44172921.
Hapalomys suntsovi	Rodentia	Abramov, Balakirev & Rozhnov	2017	Vietnam	Abramov, A.V.; Balakirev, A.E.; Rozhnov, V.V. (2017). "New insights into the taxonomy of the marmoset rats Hapalomys(Rodentia: Muridae)". Raffles Bulletin of Zoology (65): 20–28.
Monodelphis saci	Didelphimorphia	Pavan, Mendes-Oliveira & Voss	2017	Brazil (Acre, Mato Grosso, Para, Rondonia)	Pavan, S.E.; Mendes-Oliveira, A.C.; Voss, R.S. (2017). "A new species of Monodelphis (Didelphimorphia, Didelphidae) from the Brazilian Amazon". American Museum Novitates (3872): 1–20. doi:10.1206/3872.1. S2CID 90564422.
Neodon medogensis	Rodentia	S.Liu, Jin, Y.Liu, Murphy, Lv, Hao, Liao, Sun, Tang, Chen & Fu	2017	China (Xizang)	Liu, S.; Jin, W.; Liu, Y.; Murphy, R.W.; Lv, B.; Hao, H.; Liao, R.; Sun, Z.; Tang, M.; Chen, W.; Fu, J. (2017). "Taxonomic position of Chinese voles of the tribe Arvicolini and the description of 2 new species from Xizang, China". Journal of Mammalogy. 98 (1): 166–182. doi:10.1093/jmammal/gyw170. PMC 5901085. PMID 29674783.
Neodon nyalamensis	Rodentia	S.Liu, Jin, Y.Liu, Murphy, Lv, Hao, Liao, Sun, Tang, Chen & Fu	2017	China (Xizang)	Liu, S.; Jin, W.; Liu, Y.; Murphy, R.W.; Lv, B.; Hao, H.; Liao, R.; Sun, Z.; Tang, M.; Chen, W.; Fu, J. (2017). "Taxonomic position of Chinese voles of the tribe Arvicolini and the description of 2 new species from Xizang, China". Journal of Mammalogy. 98 (1): 166–182. doi:10.1093/jmammal/gyw170. PMC 5901085. PMID 29674783.
Neoromicia stanleyi	Chiroptera	Goodman, Kearney, Ratsimbazafy & Hassanin	2017	Botswana, Zambia, Zimbabwe	Goodman, S.M.; Kearney, T.; Ratsimbazafy, M.M. & Hassanin, A. (2017). "Description of a new species of Neoromicia (Chiroptera: Vespertilionidae) from southern Africa: A name for "N. cf. melckorum"". Zootaxa. 4236 (2): 351–374. doi:10.11646/zootaxa.4236.2.10. PMID 28264332.
Ototylomys chiapensis	Rodentia	Porter, Beasley, Ordóñez-Garcia, Lindsey, Rogers, Lewis-Rogers, Sites, & Bradley	2017	Mexico (Chiapas)	Porter, C.A.; Beasley, N.E.; Ordóñez-Garcia, N.; Lindsey, L.L.; Rogers, D.S.; Lewis-Rogers, N.; Sites, J.W. Jr.; Bradley, R.D (2017). "A new species of big-eared climbing rat, genus Ototylomys (Cricetidae, Tylomyinae) from Chiapas, Mexico". Journal of Mammalogy. 98 (5): 1310–1329. doi:10.1093/jmammal/gyx096. PMC 5901089. PMID 29674786.
Peromyscus kilpatricki	Rodentia	Bradley, Ordóñez-Garza, Ceballos, Rogers & Schmidly	2017	Mexico (Michoacan, Morelos)	Bradley, R.D.; Ordóñez-Garza, N.; Ceballos, G.; Rogers, D.S.; Schmidly, D.J. (2017). "A new species in the Peromyscus boylii species group (Cricetidae: Neotominae) from Michoacán, México". Journal of Mammalogy. 98 (1): 154–165. doi:10.1093/jmammal/gyw160.
Tylonycteris tonkinensis	Chiroptera	Tu, Csorba, Ruedi & Hassanin	2017	Laos, Vietnam	Tu, V.T.; Csorba, G.; Ruedi, M.; Furey, N.M.; Son, N.T.; Thong, V.D.; Bonillo, C.; Hassanin, A. (2017). "Comparative phylogeography of bamboo bats of the genus Tylonycteris (Chiroptera, Vespertilionidae) in Southeast Asia". European Journal of Taxonomy (274): 1–38. doi:10.5852/ejt.2017.274.
Uromys vika	Rodentia	Lavery & Judge	2017	Solomon Islands	Lavery, T.H.; Judge, H. (2017). "A new species of giant rat (Muridae, Uromys) from Vangunu, Solomon Islands". Journal of Mammalogy. 98 (6): 1518–1530. doi:10.1093/jmammal/gyx116.
Callosciurus honkhoaiensis	Rodentia	Nguyen, Oshida, Dang, Bui & Motokawa	2018	Vietnam	Nguyen, S.T.; Oshida, T.; Dang, P.H.; Bui, H.T.; Motokawa, M. (2018). "A new species of squirrel (Sciuridae: Callosciurus) from an isolated island off the Indochina Peninsula in southern Vietnam". Journal of Mammalogy. 99 (4): 813–825. doi:10.1093/jmammal/gyy061.
Cassistrellus yokdonensis	Chiroptera	Ruedi, Eger, Lim & Csorba	2018	Vietnam	Ruedi, M.; Eger, J.L.; Lim. B.K.; Csorba, G. (2018). "A new genus and species of vespertilionid bat from the Indomalayan Region". Journal of Mammalogy. 99 (1): 209–222. doi:10.1093/jmammal/gyx156. PMC 5901079. PMID 29674788.
Cryptotis evaristoi	Soricomorpha	Zeballos, Pino, Medina, Pari & Ceballos	2018	Peru	Zeballos, H.; Pino, K.; Medina, C.E.; Pari, A.; Chávez, D.; Tinoco, N.; Ceballos, G. (2018). "A new species of small-eared shrew of the genus Cryptotis (Mammalia, Eulipotyphla, Soricidae) from the northernmost Peruvian Andes". Zootaxa. 4377 (1): 51–73. doi:10.11646/zootaxa.4377.1.4. PMID 29690055. S2CID 21688364.
Cyclopes rufus	Pilosa	Miranda, Casali, Perini, Machado & Santos	2018	Brazil (Rondonia)	Miranda, F.R.; Casali, D.M.; Perini, F.A.; Machado, F.A.; Santos, F.R. (2018). "Taxonomic review of the genus Cyclopes Gray, 1821 (Xenarthra: Pilosa), with the revalidation and description of new species". Zoological Journal of the Linnean Society. 183 (3): 687–721. doi:10.1093/zoolinnean/zlx079. hdl:11336/49474.
Cyclopes thomasi	Pilosa	Miranda, Casali, Perini, Machado & Santos	2018	Brazil (Acre, Amazonas), Peru	Miranda, F.R.; Casali, D.M.; Perini, F.A.; Machado, F.A.; Santos, F.R. (2018). "Taxonomic review of the genus Cyclopes Gray, 1821 (Xenarthra: Pilosa), with the revalidation and description of new species". Zoological Journal of the Linnean Society. 183 (3): 687–721. doi:10.1093/zoolinnean/zlx079. hdl:11336/49474.
Cyclopes xinguensis	Pilosa	Miranda, Casali, Perini, Machado & Santos	2018	Brazil (Amazonas, Para)	Miranda, F.R.; Casali, D.M.; Perini, F.A.; Machado, F.A.; Santos, F.R. (2018). "Taxonomic review of the genus Cyclopes Gray, 1821 (Xenarthra: Pilosa), with the revalidation and description of new species". Zoological Journal of the Linnean Society. 183 (3): 687–721. doi:10.1093/zoolinnean/zlx079. hdl:11336/49474.
Halmaheramys wallacei	Rodentia	Fabre, Reeve, Fitriana, Aplin & Helgen	2018	Indonesia (Bisa, Obi)	Fabre, P.-H.; Reeve, A.H.; Fitriana, Y.S.; Aplin, K.P.; Helgen, K.M. (2018). "A new species of Halmaheramys (Rodentia: Muridae) from Bisa and Obi Islands (North Maluku Province, Indonesia)". Journal of Mammalogy. 99 (1): 187–208. doi:10.1093/jmammal/gyx160.
Mesechinus wangi	Erinaceomorpha	He, Jiang & Ai	2018	China (Yunnan)	Ai, H.-S.; He, K.; Chen, Z.-Z.; Li, J.-Q.; Wan, T.; Li, Q.; Nie, W.-H.; Wang, J.-H.; Su, W.-T.; Jiang, X.-L. (2018). "Taxonomic revision of the genus Mesechinus (Mammalia: Erinaceidae) with description of a new species". Zoological Research. 39 (5): 335–347. doi:10.24272/j.issn.2095-8137.2018.034. PMC 6102679. PMID 29695683.
Molossus fentoni	Chiroptera	Loureiro, Lim & Engstrom	2018	Ecuador, Guyana	Loureiro, L.O.; Lim, B.K.; Engstrom, M.D. (2018). "A new species of mastiff bat (Chiroptera, Molossidae, Molossus) from Guyana and Ecuador". Mammalian Biology. 90: 10–21. doi:10.1016/j.mambio.2018.01.008.
Palawanosorex muscorum	Soricomorpha	Hutterer, Balete, Giarla, Heaney & Esselstyn	2018	Philippines (Palawan)	Hutterer, R.; Balete, D.S.; Giarla, T.C.; Heaney, L.R.; Esselstyn, J.A. (2018). "A new genus and species of shrew (Mammalia: Soricidae) from Palawan Island, Philippines". Journal of Mammalogy. 99 (3): 518–536. doi:10.1093/jmammal/gyy041.
Pteronotus alitonus	Chiroptera	Pavan, Bobrowiec & Percequillo	2018	Brazil (Amapa, Amazonas, Para), French Guiana, Guyana, Suriname	Pavan, A.C.; Bobrowiec, P.E.D.; Percequillo, A.R. (2018). "Geographic variation in a South American clade of mormoopid bats, Pteronotus (Phyllodia), with description of a new species". Journal of Mammalogy. 99 (3): 624–645. doi:10.1093/jmammal/gyy048.
Rhinolophus gorongosae	Chiroptera	Taylor, Macdonald, Goodman, Kearney, Cotterill, Stoffberg, Monadjem, Schoeman, Guyton, Naskrecki & Richards	2018	Mozambique	Taylor, P.J.; Macdonald, A.; Goodman, S.M.; Kearney, T.; Cotterill, F.P.D.; Stoffberg, S.; Monadjem, A.; Schoeman, M.C.; Guyton, J.; Naskrecki, P.; Richards, L.R. (2018). "Integrative Taxonomy Resolves Three New Cryptic Species of Small southern African Horseshoe Bats (Rhinolophus)". Zoological Journal of the Linnean Society. zly024 (4): 1249–1276. doi:10.1093/zoolinnean/zly024. hdl:2263/69231.
Talpa martinorum	Soricomorpha	Kryštufek, Nedyalkov, Astrin & Hutterer	2018	Bulgaria, Turkey	Kryštufek, B.; Nedyalkov, N.; Astrin, J.J.; Hutterer, R. (2018). "News from the Balkan refugium: Thrace has an endemic mole species (Mammalia: Talpidae)". Bonn Zoological Bulletin. 67 (1): 41–57.
Tanyuromys thomasleei	Rodentia	Timm, Pine & Hanson	2018	Ecuador	Timm, R.M.; Pine, R.H.; Hanson, J.D. (2018). "A new species of Tanyuromys Pine, Timm, and Weksler, 2012 (Cricetidae: Oryzomyini), with comments on relationships within the Oryzomyini". Journal of Mammalogy. 99 (3): 608–623. doi:10.1093/jmammal/gyy042. hdl:1808/26450.
Plecturocebus grovesi	Primates	Boubli et al.	2018	Brazil (Mato Grosso)	Boubli Jean P., Byrne Hazel, Maria, Silva-Júnior José, Costa Araújo Rodrigo, Bertuol Fabrício, Gonçalves Jonas, de Melo Fabiano R., Rylands Anthony B., Mittermeier Russell A., Silva Felipe E., Nash Stephen D., Canale Gustavo, Raony, Alencar M., Rossi Rogerio V., Carneiro Jeferson, Sampaio Iracilda, Farias Izeni P., Schneider Horácio, Hrbek Tomas (2019). "On a new species of titi monkey (Primates: Plecturocebus Byrne et al., 2016), from Alta Floresta, southern Amazon, Brazil". Molecular Phylogenetics and Evolution. 132: 117–137. doi:10.1016/j.ympev.2018.11.012. PMID 30496844. S2CID 54166316.
Biswamoyopterus gaoligongensis	Rodentia	Q.Li, X.-Y.Li, Jackson, F.Li, Jiang, Zhao, Song & Jiang	2019	China (Yunnan)	Li, Q.; Li, X.-Y.; Jackson, S.M.; Li, F.; Jiang, M.; Zhao, W.; Song, W.-Y.; Jiang, X.-L. (2019). "Discovery and description of a mysterious Asian flying squirrel (Rodentia, Sciuridae, Biswamoyopterus) from Mount Gaoligong, southwest China". ZooKeys (864): 147–160. doi:10.3897/zookeys.864.33678. PMC 6658571. PMID 31367180.
Eothenomys jinyangensis	Rodentia	S.-Y.Liu, Chen, He, Tang, Y.Liu, Jin, S.Li, Q.Li, Zeng, Sun, Fu, Liao, Meng, Wang, Jiang & Murphy	2019	China (Sichuan)	Liu, S.-Y.; Chen, S.-D.; He, K.; Tang, M.; Liu, Y.; Jin, W.; Li, S.; Li, Q.; Zeng, T.; Sun, Z.-Y.; Fu, J.-R.; Liao, R.; Meng, Y.; Wang, X.; Jiang, X.-L.; Murphy, R.W. (2019). "Molecular phylogeny and taxonomy of subgenus Eothenomys (Cricetidae: Arvicolinae: Eothenomys) with the description of four new species from Sichuan, China". Zoological Journal of the Linnean Society. 186 (2): 569–598. doi:10.1093/zoolinnean/zly071.
Eothenomys luojishanensis	Rodentia	S.-Y.Liu, Chen, He, Tang, Y.Liu, Jin, S.Li, Q.Li, Zeng, Sun, Fu, Liao, Meng, Wang, Jiang & Murphy	2019	China (Sichuan)	Liu, S.-Y.; Chen, S.-D.; He, K.; Tang, M.; Liu, Y.; Jin, W.; Li, S.; Li, Q.; Zeng, T.; Sun, Z.-Y.; Fu, J.-R.; Liao, R.; Meng, Y.; Wang, X.; Jiang, X.-L.; Murphy, R.W. (2019). "Molecular phylogeny and taxonomy of subgenus Eothenomys (Cricetidae: Arvicolinae: Eothenomys) with the description of four new species from Sichuan, China". Zoological Journal of the Linnean Society. 186 (2): 569–598. doi:10.1093/zoolinnean/zly071.
Eothenomys meiguensis	Rodentia	S.-Y.Liu, Chen, He, Tang, Y.Liu, Jin, S.Li, Q.Li, Zeng, Sun, Fu, Liao, Meng, Wang, Jiang & Murphy	2019	China (Sichuan)	Liu, S.-Y.; Chen, S.-D.; He, K.; Tang, M.; Liu, Y.; Jin, W.; Li, S.; Li, Q.; Zeng, T.; Sun, Z.-Y.; Fu, J.-R.; Liao, R.; Meng, Y.; Wang, X.; Jiang, X.-L.; Murphy, R.W. (2019). "Molecular phylogeny and taxonomy of subgenus Eothenomys (Cricetidae: Arvicolinae: Eothenomys) with the description of four new species from Sichuan, China". Zoological Journal of the Linnean Society. 186 (2): 569–598. doi:10.1093/zoolinnean/zly071.
Eothenomys shimianensis	Rodentia	S.-Y.Liu, Chen, He, Tang, Y.Liu, Jin, S.Li, Q.Li, Zeng, Sun, Fu, Liao, Meng, Wang, Jiang & Murphy	2019	China (Sichuan)	Liu, S.-Y.; Chen, S.-D.; He, K.; Tang, M.; Liu, Y.; Jin, W.; Li, S.; Li, Q.; Zeng, T.; Sun, Z.-Y.; Fu, J.-R.; Liao, R.; Meng, Y.; Wang, X.; Jiang, X.-L.; Murphy, R.W. (2019). "Molecular phylogeny and taxonomy of subgenus Eothenomys (Cricetidae: Arvicolinae: Eothenomys) with the description of four new species from Sichuan, China". Zoological Journal of the Linnean Society. 186 (2): 569–598. doi:10.1093/zoolinnean/zly071.
Eptesicus ulapesensis	Chiroptera	Sánchez, Montani, Tomasco, Díaz & Barquez	2019	Argentina (La Rioja, Mendoza)	Sánchez, R.T.; Montani, M.E.; Tomasco, I.H.; Díaz, M.M.; Barquez, R.M. (2019). "A new species of Eptesicus (Chiroptera, Vespertilionidae) from Argentina". Journal of Mammalogy. 100 (1): 118–129. doi:10.1093/jmammal/gyz009. hdl:11336/115220. S2CID 91628913.
Mico munduruku	Primates	Costa-Araújo, de Melo, Canale, Hernández-Rangel, Messias, Rossi, Silva, Ferreira da Silva, Nash, Boubli, Farias & Hrbek	2019	Brazil (Para)	Costa-Araújo, R.; de Melo, F.R.; Canale, G.R.; Hernández-Rangel, S.M.; Messias, M.R.; Rossi, R.V.; Silva, F.E.; Ferreira da Silva, M.N.; Nash, S.D.; Boubli, J.P.; Farias, I.P.; Hrbek, T. (2019). "The Munduruku marmoset: a new monkey species from southern Amazonia". PeerJ. 7 e7019. doi:10.7717/peerj.7019. PMC 6661146. PMID 31380146.
Monodelphis vossi	Didelphimorphia	Pavan	2019	Brazil (Roraima)	Pavan, S.E. (2019). "A revision of the Monodelphis glirina group (Didelphidae: Marmosini), with a description of a new species from Roraima, Brazil". Journal of Mammalogy. 100 (1): 103–117. doi:10.1093/jmammal/gyy165. S2CID 91625928.
Oxymycterus itapeby	Rodentia	Peçanha, Quintela, Ribas, Althoff, Maestri, Gonçalves & de Freitas	2019	Brazil	Peçanha, W.T.; Quintela, F.M.; Ribas, L.E.J.; Althoff, S.L.; Maestri, R.; Gonçalves, G.L.; de Freitas, T.R.O. (2019). "A new species of Oxymycterus (Rodentia: Cricetidae: Sigmodontinae) from a transitional area of Cerrado – Atlantic Forest in southeastern Brazil". Journal of Mammalogy. 100 (2): 578–598. doi:10.1093/jmammal/gyz060.
Rhynchomys labo	Rodentia	Rickart, Balete, Timm, Alviola, Esselstyn & Heaney	2019	Philippines (Luzon)	Rickart, E.A.; Balete, D.S.; Timm, R.M.; Alviola, P.A.; Esselstyn, J.A.; Heaney, L.R. (2019). "Two new species of shrew-rats (Rhynchomys: Muridae: Rodentia) from Luzon Island, Philippines". Journal of Mammalogy. 100 (4): 1112–1129. doi:10.1093/jmammal/gyz066. hdl:1808/29417. S2CID 201209688.
Rhynchomys mingan	Rodentia	Rickart, Balete, Timm, Alviola, Esselstyn & Heaney	2019	Philippines (Luzon)	Rickart, E.A.; Balete, D.S.; Timm, R.M.; Alviola, P.A.; Esselstyn, J.A.; Heaney, L.R. (2019). "Two new species of shrew-rats (Rhynchomys: Muridae: Rodentia) from Luzon Island, Philippines". Journal of Mammalogy. 100 (4): 1112–1129. doi:10.1093/jmammal/gyz066. hdl:1808/29417. S2CID 201209688.
Berardius minimus	Cetacea	Tadasu K. Yamada, Shino Kitamura, Syuiti Abe, Yuko Tajima, Ayaka Matsuda, James G. Mead & Takashi F. Matsuishi	2019	Northern Pacific (Japan and the Bering Sea)	Tadasu K. Yamada.; Shino Kitamura.; Syuiti Abe.; Yuko Tajima.; Ayaka Matsuda.; James G. Mead; Takashi F. Matsuishi. (2019). "Description of a new species of beaked whale (Berardius) found in the North Pacific". Scientific Reports. 9 (1): 12723. Bibcode:2019NatSR...912723Y. doi:10.1038/s41598-019-46703-w. hdl:1808/29417. PMC 6717206. PMID 31471538.
Tarsius niemitzi	Primates	Shekelle et al.	2019	Indonesia	Myron Shekelle, Colin P. Groves, Ibnu Maryanto, Russell A. Mittermeier, Agus Salim und Mark S. Springer: A New Tarsier Species from the Togean Islands of Central Sulawesi, Indonesia, with References to Wallacea and Conservation on Sulawesi. Primate Conservation 2019 (33), 2019, S. 1–9 PDF

== Living subspecies ==
Name	Order	Author	Year	Distribution	Reference
Arvicola scherman gutsulius	Rodentia	Zagorodnyuk	2000	Ukraine	Zagorodnyuk, I.V. 2000. Nomenclature and system of genus Arvicola. pp. 174–192 in Species of the fauna of Russia and the contiguous countries. The water vole: Mode of the species. Moscow: Nauka Publishers, 527 pp. (in Russian).
Calomyscus elburzensis firiusaensis	Rodentia	Meyer & Malikov	2000	Turkmenistan	Meyer, M.N. & Malikov, V.G. 2000. New species and subspecies of mouse-like hamsters of the genus Calomyscus (Rodentia, Cricetidae) from southern Turkmenistan. Zoologischeskii Zhurnal 79(2):219–223 (in Russian, with English summary).
Calomyscus elburzensis zykovi	Rodentia	Meyer & Malikov	2000	Turkmenistan	Meyer, M.N. & Malikov, V.G. 2000. New species and subspecies of mouse-like hamsters of the genus Calomyscus (Rodentia, Cricetidae) from southern Turkmenistan. Zoologischeskii Zhurnal 79(2):219–223 (in Russian, with English summary).
Civettictis civetta pauli	Carnivora	Kock, Künzel & Rayaleh	2000	Djibouti	Kock, D., Kunzel, T. & Rayaleh, H.A. 2000. The African civet, Civettictis civetta (Schreber, 1776), of Djibouti representing a new subspecies. Senckenbergiana Biologica 80:241–246.
Eothenomys custos changshanensis	Rodentia	Wang & Li	2000	China (Yunnan)	Wang, Y.-X., Li, C.-Y. 2000. Mammalia, vol. 6, Rodentia, Part III: Cricetidae. In: Luo, Z.-X., Chen, W., Wu, G. (eds.), Fauna Sinica. Science Press, Beijing (in Chinese with English summary).
Eothenomys custos ninglangensis	Rodentia	Wang & Li	2000	China (Sichuan, Yunnan)	Wang, Y.-X., Li, C.-Y. 2000. Mammalia, vol. 6, Rodentia, Part III: Cricetidae. In: Luo, Z.-X., Chen, W., Wu, G. (eds.), Fauna Sinica. Science Press, Beijing (in Chinese with English summary).
Eothenomys melanogaster chenduensis	Rodentia	Wang & Li	2000	China	Wang, Y.-X., Li, C.-Y. 2000. Mammalia, vol. 6, Rodentia, Part III: Cricetidae. In: Luo, Z.-X., Chen, W., Wu, G. (eds.), Fauna Sinica. Science Press, Beijing (in Chinese with English summary).
Eothenomys melanogaster yingjiangensis	Rodentia	Wang & Li	2000	China	Wang, Y.-X., Li, C.-Y. 2000. Mammalia, vol. 6, Rodentia, Part III: Cricetidae. In: Luo, Z.-X., Chen, W., Wu, G. (eds.), Fauna Sinica. Science Press, Beijing (in Chinese with English summary).
Eothenomys olitor hypolitor	Rodentia	Wang & Li	2000	China (Yunnan)	Wang, Y.-X., Li, C.-Y. 2000. Mammalia, vol. 6, Rodentia, Part III: Cricetidae. In: Luo, Z.-X., Chen, W., Wu, G. (eds.), Fauna Sinica. Science Press, Beijing (in Chinese with English summary).
Geomys bursarius ozarkensis	Rodentia	Elrod, Zimmermann, Sudman & Heidt	2000	USA (Arkansas)	Elrod, D.A., Zimmerman, E.G., Sudman, P.D. & Heidt, G.A. 2000. A new subspecies of pocket gopher (genus Geomys) from the Ozark Mountains of Arkansas with comments on its historical biogeography. Journal of Mammalogy 81(3):852–864.
Glossophaga longirostris maricelae	Chiroptera	Soriano, Fariñas & Naranjo	2000	Venezuela	Soriano, P.S., Fariñas, M.R. & Naranjo, M.E. 2000. A new subspecies of Miller's long-tongued bat (Glossophaga longirostris) from a semiarid enclave of the Venezuelan Andes. Zeitschrift für Säugetierkunde 65(6):369–374.
Mellivora capensis buechneri	Carnivora	Baryshnikov	2000	Turkmenistan	Baryshnikov, G. 2000. A new subspecies of the honey badger Mellivora capensis from Central Asia. Acta Theriologica 45(1):45–55, March 2000.
Miniopterus schreibersii bassanii	Chiroptera	Cardinal & Christidis	2000	Australia (South Australia, Victoria)	Christidis, L. & Cardinal, B.R. 2000. Mitochondrial DNA and morphology reveal three geographically distinct lineages of the large bentwing bat (Miniopterus schreibersii) in Australia. Australian Journal of Zoology 48(1):1–19.
Myotis mystacinus caucasicus	Chiroptera	Tsytsulina	2000		Tsytsulina, K.A. in Benda, P. & Tsytsulina, K.A. 2000. Таксономическая ревизия группы Myotis mystacinus group (Mammalia: Chiroptera) в западной Палеарктике // Taxonomic revision of Myotis mystacinus group (Mammalia: Chiroptera) in the western Palearctic. Acta Societatis Zoologicae Bohemicae, 64:331–398.
Myotis mystacinus occidentalis	Chiroptera	Benda	2000		Benda, P. in Benda, P. & Tsytsulina, K.A. 2000. Таксономическая ревизия группы Myotis mystacinus group (Mammalia: Chiroptera) в западной Палеарктике // Taxonomic revision of Myotis mystacinus group (Mammalia: Chiroptera) in the western Palearctic. Acta Societatis Zoologicae Bohemicae, 64:331–398.
Necromys obscurus scagliarum	Rodentia	Galliari & Pardiñas	2000	Argentina (Buenos Aires)	Galliari, C.A. & Pardiñas, U.F.J. 2000. Taxonomy and distribution of the sigmodontine rodents of genus Necromys in central Argentina and Uruguay. Acta Theriologica 45(2):211–232.
Niviventer confucianus deqinensis	Rodentia	Deng & Wang	2000	China (Yunnan)	Deng, X.-Y., Feng, Q. & Wang, Y.-X. 2000. Differentiation of subspecies of Chinese white-bellied rat (Niviventer confucianus) in southwestern China with descriptions of two new subspecies. Zoological Research 5:375–382 (in Chinese, with English abstract).
Niviventer confucianus yajiangensis	Rodentia	Deng & Wang	2000	China (Sichuan)	Deng, X.-Y., Feng, Q. & Wang, Y.-X. 2000. Differentiation of subspecies of Chinese white-bellied rat (Niviventer confucianus) in southwestern China with descriptions of two new subspecies. Zoological Research 5:375–382 (in Chinese, with English abstract).
Tamias senex pacificus	Rodentia	Sutton & Patterson	2000	USA (California)	Sutton, D.A. & Patterson, B.D. 2000. Geographic variation of the western chipmunks Tamias senex and T. siskiyou, with two new subspecies from California. Journal of Mammalogy 81(2):299–316.
Tamias siskiyou humboldtii	Rodentia	Sutton & Patterson	2000	USA (California)	Sutton, D.A. & Patterson, B.D. 2000. Geographic variation of the western chipmunks Tamias senex and T. siskiyou, with two new subspecies from California. Journal of Mammalogy 81(2):299–316.
Cephalophus nigrifrons hypoxanthus	Artiodactyla	Grubb & Groves	2001	Congo (Dem.Rep.)	Grubb, P. & Groves, C.P. 2001. Revision and Classification of the Cephalophinae. In: Wilson, V.J. (ed.), Duikers of Africa: Masters of the African Forest Floor:703–728.
Cephalophus silvicultor curticeps	Artiodactyla	Grubb & Groves	2001	Burundi, Kenya, Rwanda, Uganda	Grubb, P. & Groves, C.P. 2001. Revision and Classification of the Cephalophinae. In: Wilson, V.J. (ed.), Duikers of Africa: Masters of the African Forest Floor:703–728.
Molossus currentium robustus	Chiroptera	Lopez-Gonzalez & Presley	2001		López-González, C. & Presley, S.J. 2001. Taxonomic status of Molossus bondae J.A. Allen, 1904 (Chiroptera: Molossidae), with description of a new subspecies. Journal of Mammalogy 82(3):760–774.
Myotis frater eniseensis	Chiroptera	Tsytsulina & Strelkov	2001	Russia (Altai, Irkutsk, Khakassia, Krasnoyarsk)	Tsytsulina, K. & Strelkov, P.P. 2001. Taxonomy of the Myotis frater species group (Vespertilionidae, Chiroptera). Bonner zoologische Beiträge 50:15–26.
Neoromicia nana meesteri	Chiroptera	Kock	2001	South Africa (Eastern Cape)	Kock, D. 2001. Pipistrellus africanus meesteri, nom. nov. for Pipistrellus nanus australis Roberts, 1913 (Mammalia: Chiroptera: Vespertilionidae). Acta Chiropterologica 3(1):129–130.
Nyctimene keasti babari	Chiroptera	Bergmans	2001	Indonesia (Babar Islands)	Bergmans, W. 2001. Notes on distribution and taxonomy of Australasian bats. I. Pteropodinae and Nyctimeninae (Mammalia, Megachiroptera, Pteropodidae). Beaufortia 51:119–152.
Paranyctimene tenax marculus	Chiroptera	Bergmans	2001	Indonesia (Irian Jaya, Waigeo)	Bergmans, W. 2001. Notes on distribution and taxonomy of Australasian bats. I. Pteropodinae and Nyctimeninae (Mammalia, Megachiroptera, Pteropodidae). Beaufortia 51:119–152.
Paranyctimene tenax tenax	Chiroptera	Bergmans	2001	Papua New Guinea (New Guinea)	Bergmans, W. 2001. Notes on distribution and taxonomy of Australasian bats. I. Pteropodinae and Nyctimeninae (Mammalia, Megachiroptera, Pteropodidae). Beaufortia 51:119–152.
Solenodon paradoxus woodi	Eulipotyphla	Ottenwalder	2001	Dominican Republic, Haiti	Ottenwalder, J.A. 2001. Systematics and biogeography of the West Indian genus Solenodon. pp. 253–259 in Woods, C.A. & Sergile, F.E. (eds.). Biogeography of the West Indies: Patterns and perspectives. Boca Raton, Florida: CRC Press, 582 pp.
Barbastella barbastellus guanchae	Chiroptera	Trujillo, Ibanez & Juste	2002	Spain (Canary Islands)	Trujillo, D., Ibanez, C. & Juste, J. 2002. A new subspecies of Barbastella barbastellus (Mammalia : Chiroptera : Vespertilionidae) from the Canary islands. Revue Suisse de Zoologie 109(3):543–550.
Cephalorhynchus hectori maui	Cetacea	Baker, Smith & Pichler	2002	Pacific Ocean	Baker, A.N., Smith, A.H. and Pichler, F.B. 2002. Geographical variation in Hector's dolphin: recognition of a new subspecies of Cephalorhynchus hectori. Journal of the Royal Society of New Zealand 32:713–727.
Crocidura rapax lutaoensis	Eulipotyphla	Fang & Lee	2002	Taiwan	Fang, Y.-P. & Lee L.-L. 2002. Re-evaluation of the Taiwanese white-toothed shrew, Crocidura tadae Tokuda and Kano, 1936 (Insectivora: Soricidae) from Taiwan and two offshore islands. Journal of Zoology. 257:145–154.
Miniopterus paululus graysonae	Chiroptera	Kitchener	2002	Indonesia (Tanimbar Islands)	Kitchener, D.J. & Suyanto, A. 2002. Morphological variation in Miniopterus pusillus and M. australis (sensu Hill 1992) in southeastern Asia, New Guinea and Australia. Records of the Western Australian Museum 21:9–33.
Ozotoceros bezoarticus arerunguaensis	Artiodactyla	González, Álvarez-Valin & Maldonado	2002	Uruguay	González Susana, Fernando Álvarez-Valin, and Jesús E. Maldonado (2002) Morphometric differentiation of endangered pampas deer (Ozotoceros bezoarticus L. 1758), with description of new subspecies from Uruguay. Journal of Mammalogy 83 (4): 1127–1140.
Ozotoceros bezoarticus uruguayensis	Artiodactyla	González, Álvarez-Valin & Maldonado	2002	Uruguay	González Susana, Fernando Álvarez-Valin, and Jesús E. Maldonado (2002) Morphometric differentiation of endangered pampas deer (Ozotoceros bezoarticus L. 1758), with description of new subspecies from Uruguay. Journal of Mammalogy 83 (4): 1127–1140.
Crocidura goliath nimbasilvanus	Soricomorpha	Hutterer	2003	Guinea, Côte d'Ivorie, Liberia	Hutterer R. (2003). "Two replacement names and a note on the author of the shrew family Soricidae (Mammalia)". Bonner Zoologische Beiträge. 50: 369–370.
Gazella bennettii salinarum	Artiodactyla	Groves	2003	India	Groves, C.P. (2003). "Taxonomy of ungulates of the Indian Subcontinent". Journal of the Bombay Natural History Society. 100 (2–3): 341–362.
Lagostrophus fasciatus baudinettei	Diprotodontia	Helgen & Flannery	2003	Australia	Helgen, K.M., Flannery, T.F. (2003). "Taxonomy and historical distribution of the wallaby genus Lagostrophus". Australian Journal of Zoology. 51 (3): 199–212. doi:10.1071/zo02078.
Meles meles milleri	Carnivora	Baryshnikov, Puzachenko & Abramov	2003	Norway	Baryshnikov G.F.; Puzachenko A. Yu.; Abramov A.V. (2003). "New analysis of variability of cheek teeth in badgers (Carnivora, Mustelidae, Meles)". Russian Journal of Theriology. 1 (2): 133–149. doi:10.15298/rusjtheriol.01.2.07.
Petaurista petaurista chaoyuensis	Rodentia	Feng & Zheng	2003	China	Feng, Z.; Zheng, C. 2003. Petaurista albiventer chayuensis. In A Complete Checklist of Mammal Species and Subspecies in China: A Taxonomic and Geographic Reference. Y.-X. Wang. p. 157. Beijing: Chinese Forestry Publishing House.
Rattus argentiventer kalimantanensis	Rodentia	Maryanto	2003	Indonesia (Kalimantan)	Maryanto, I. (2003). "Taxonomic status of the ricefield rat Rattus argentiventer (Robinson and Kloss, 1916) (Rodentia) from Thailand, Malaysia and Indonesia based on morphological variation". Records of the Western Australian Museum. 22: 47–65. doi:10.18195/issn.0312-3162.22(1).2003.047-065. S2CID 90943596.
Rhizomys sinensis neowardi	Rodentia	Wang	2003	China	Wang, Y.X. (2003). A Complete Checklist of Mammal Species and Subspecies in China (A Taxonomic and Geographic Reference). Beijing, China: China Forestry Publishing House.
Rhizomys sinensis pediculus	Rodentia	Wang	2003	China	Wang, Y.X. (2003). A Complete Checklist of Mammal Species and Subspecies in China (A Taxonomic and Geographic Reference). Beijing, China: China Forestry Publishing House.
Trachypithecus geei bhutanensis	Primates	Wangchuk, Inouye & Hare	2003	Bhutan	Wangchuk, T.; Inouye, D. W.; Hare, M. P. (2003). "A new subspecies of golden langur (Trachypithecus geei) from Bhutan". Folia Primatologica. 74 (2): 104–108. doi:10.1159/000070007. PMID 12778923. S2CID 46809693.
Chaetodipus arenarius ramirezpulidoi	Rodentia	Álvarez-Castañeda & Cortés-Calva	2004	Mexico	Álvarez–Castañeda, S. T., and P. Cortés–Calva. 2004. A new subspecies of sand pocket mouse Chaetodipus arenarius (Rodentia: Heteromyidae) from Baja California Sur. Pp. 33–40 in Homenaje a la trayectoria mastozoológica de José Ramírez Pulido (A. Castro Campillo and J. Ortega, eds.). Universidad Autónoma Metropolitana, Unidad Iztapalapa, xiv+234 pp.
Anomalurus pelii peralbus	Rodentia	Schunke & Hutterer	2005	Côte d'Ivoire	Schunke, A. & Hutterer, R. 2005. Geographic variation in the West African scaly-tail squirrel Anomalurus pelii (Schlegel and Müller, 1845) with description of a new subspecies (Rodentia: Anomaluridae). In: Huber, B.A., Sinclair, B.J. and Lampe, K.-H. (eds), 5th International Symposium on Tropical Biology, pp. 321–328. Museum Koenig, Bonn.
Murina ussuriensis katerinae	Chiroptera	Kruskop	2005	Russia	Kruskop S.V. (2005). "Towards the taxonomy of the Russian Murina (Vespertilionidae, Chiroptera)". Russian Journal of Theriology. 4 (2): 91–99. doi:10.15298/rusjtheriol.04.2.01.
Rhipidomys cariri baturiteensis	Rodentia	Tribe	2005	Brazil	Tribe, C.J. (2005). "A new species of Rhipidomys (Rodentia, Muroidea) from North-Eastern Brazil". Arquivos do Museu Nacional, Rio de Janeiro. 63 (1): 131–146.
Sorex caecutiens hallamontanus	Soricomorpha	Abe & Oh	2005	South Korea	Ohdachi SD, Abe H, Oh HS, Han SH (2005). "Morphological relationships among populations in the Sorex caecutiens/shinto group (Eulipotyphla, Soricidae) in East Asia, with a description of a new subspecies from Cheju Island, Korea". Mammalian Biology. 70 (6): 345–358. doi:10.1016/j.mambio.2005.06.004. hdl:2115/986.
Avahi meridionalis ramanantsoavanai	Primates	Zaramody, Fausser, Roos, Zinner, Andriaholinirina, Rabarivola, Norscia, Tattersall & Rumpler	2006	Madagascar	Zaramody, A.; Fausser, J.-L.; Roos, C.; Zinner, D.; Andriaholinirina, N.; Rabarivola, C.; Norscia, I.; Tattersall, I.; Rumpler, Y. (2006). "Molecular phylogeny and taxonomic revision of the eastern woolly lemurs (Avahi laniger)". Primate Report. 74: 9–23.
Hipposideeos ater nallamalensis	Chiroptera	Srinivasulu & Srinivasulu	2006	India	Srinivasulu, C.; Srinivasulu, B. (2006). "First record of Hipposideros ater Templeton 1848 from Andhra Pradesh, India with a description of a new subspecies". Zoos' Print Journal. 21 (5): 2241–2244. doi:10.11609/JoTT.ZPJ.1505.2241-4. S2CID 111376786.
Panthera tigris jacksoni	Carnivora	Luo et al.	2006	Malaysia	Luo, S.-J., Kim, J.-H., Johnson, W. E., van der Walt, J., Martenson, J., Yuhki, N., Miquelle, D. G., Uphyrkina, O., Goodrich, J. M., Quigley, H. B., Tilson, R., Brady, G., Martelli, P., Subramaniam, V., McDougal, C., Hean, S., Huang, S.-Q., Pan, W., Karanth, U. K., Sunquist, M., Smith, J. L. D., O'Brien, S. J. (2004). "Phylogeography and genetic ancestry of tigers (Panthera tigris)". PLOS Biology. 2 (12) e442. doi:10.1371/journal.pbio.0020442. PMC 534810. PMID 15583716.
Tamiops swinhoei markamensis	Rodentia	Li, Feng, Yang & Wang	2006	China	Song Li; Qing Feng; Jun-Xing Yang & Ying-Xiang Wang (2006). "Differentiation of Subspecies of Asiatic Striped Squirrels (Tamiops swinhoei) (Milne-Edwards) (Rodentia: Sciuridae) in China with Description of a New Subspecies". Zoological Studies. 45 (2): 180–189.
Cephalorhynchus commersonii kerguelenensis	Cetacea	Robineau, Goodall, Pichler & Baker	2007	Indian Ocean	Robineau, D., Goodall, R.N.P., Pichler, F. & Baker, C.S. (2007). "Description of a new subspecies of Commerson's dolphin, Cephalorhynchus commersonii (Lacépède, 1804), inhabiting the coastal waters of the Kerguelen Islands". Mammalia. 71 (4): 172–180. doi:10.1515/mamm.2007.034. S2CID 85134864.
Neofelis diardi borneensis	Carnivora	Wilting, Buckley-Beason, Feldhaar, Gadau, O'Brien & Linsenmair	2007	Brunei Darussalam; Indonesia (Kalimantan); Malaysia (Sabah, Sarawak)	Wilting A., Buckley-Beason, V.A., Feldhaar, H., Gadau, J., O'Brien, S.J., Linsenmair, S.E. (2007). "Clouded leopard phylogeny revisited: support for species and subspecies recognition". Frontiers in Zoology. 4: 15. doi:10.1186/1742-9994-4-15. PMC 1904214. PMID 17535420.
Perodicticus potto stockleyi	Primates	Butynski & De Jong	2007	Kenya	Butynski, T.M. & Jong, Y.A. de. 2007. Distribution of the potto Perodicticus potto (Primates: Lorisidae) in eastern Africa, with a description of a new subspecies from Mount Kenya. Journal of East African Natural History 96(2):113–147.
Pipistrellus pygmaeus cyprius	Chiroptera	Benda	2007	Cyprus	Benda, P., Hanák, V., Horáček, I., Hulva, P., Lučan, R. & Ruedi, M. 2007. Bats (Mammalia: Chiroptera) of the Eastern Mediterranean. Part 5. Bat fauna of Cyprus: review of records with confirmation of six species new for the island and description of a new subspecies. Acta Societatis Zoologicae Bohemicae 71:71–130.
Trachypithecus cristatus selangorensis	Primates	Roos, Nadler & Walter	2008	Malaysia	Roos C.; Nadler T.; Walter L. (2008). "Mitochondrial phylogeny, taxonomy and biogeography of the silvered langur species group (Trachypithecus cristatus)". Molecular Phylogenetics and Evolution. 47 (2): 629–636. doi:10.1016/j.ympev.2008.03.006. PMID 18406631.
Nyctophilus major tor	Chiroptera	Parnaby	2009	Australia (South Australia, Western Australia)	Parnaby, H.E. 2009. A taxonomic review of Australian Greater Long-eared Bats previously known as Nyctophilus timoriensis (Chiroptera: Vespertilionidae) and some associated taxa. Australian Zoologist 35:39–81.
Saguinus fuscicollis mura	Primates	Röhe, Silva Jr, Sampaio & Rylands	2009	Brazil	Röhe, F.; Silva Jr, J.S.; Sampaio, R.; Rylands, A.B. (2009) A New Subspecies of Saguinus fuscicollis (Primates, Callitrichidae). International Journal of Primatology 30:533–551.
Microtus irani karamani	Rodentia	Kryštufek, Vohralík, Zima, Koubínová & Bužan	2010	Turkey	Kryštufek, B., Vohralík, V., Zima, J., Koubínová, D. & Bužan, E.V. 2010. A new subspecies of the Iranian Vole, Microtus irani Thomas, 1921, from Turkey (Mammalia: Rodentia). Zoology in the Middle East 50:11–18
Vulpes vulpes patwin	Carnivora	Sacks, Statham, Perrine, Wisely & Aubry	2010	USA (California)	Sacks, B.N., Statham, M.J., Perrine, J.D., Wisely, S.M. & Aubry, K.B. 2010. North American montane red foxes: expansion, fragmentation, and the origin of the Sacramento Valley red fox. Conservation Genetics 11:1523–1539 doi:10.1007/s10592-010-0053-4
Chironax melanocephalus dyasae	Chiroptera	Maharadatunkamsi	2012	Indonesia (Kalimantan)	Maharadatunkamsi. 2012. Morphological variation in Chironax melanocephalus (Chiroptera: Pteropodidae) from Indonesia and description of new subspecies. Treubia 39: 51–65
Hipposideros alongensis sungi	Chiroptera	Thong, Puechmaille, Denzinger, Bates, Dietz, Csorba, Soisook, Teeling, Matsumura, Furey & Schnitzler	2012	Vietnam	Thong, V.D., Puechmaille, S.J., Denzinger, A., Bates, P.J.J., Dietz, C., Csorba, G., Soisook, P., Teeling, E.C., Matsumura, S., Furey, N.M. & Schnitzler, H.-U. 2012. Systematics of the Hipposideros turpis complex and a description of a new subspecies from Vietnam. Mammalian Review 42: 166–192
Hoolock hoolock mishmiensis	Primates	Choudhury	2013	India (NE India)	Choudhury, A.U. (2013). Description of a new subspecies of Hoolock gibbon Hoolock hoolock from North East India. The Newsletter & Journal of the Rhino Foundation for nat. in NE India 9: 49–59, plates.
Bassaricyon neblina hershkovitzi	Carnivora	K.Helgen, Pinto, Kays, L.Helgen, Tsuchiya, Quinn, Wilson & Maldonado	2013	Colombia	Helgen, K.M., Pinto, M., Kays, R., Helgen, L., Tsuchiya, M., Quinn, A., Wilson, D. & Maldonado, J. 2013. Taxonomic revision of the olingos (Bassaricyon), with description of a new species, the Olinguito. ZooKeys 324: 1–83.
Bassaricyon neblina osborni	Carnivora	K.Helgen, Pinto, Kays, L.Helgen, Tsuchiya, Quinn, Wilson & Maldonado	2013	Colombia	Helgen, K.M., Pinto, M., Kays, R., Helgen, L., Tsuchiya, M., Quinn, A., Wilson, D. & Maldonado, J. 2013. Taxonomic revision of the olingos (Bassaricyon), with description of a new species, the Olinguito. ZooKeys 324: 1–83.
Bassaricyon neblina ruber	Carnivora	K.Helgen, Pinto, Kays, L.Helgen, Tsuchiya, Quinn, Wilson & Maldonado	2013	Colombia	Helgen, K.M., Pinto, M., Kays, R., Helgen, L., Tsuchiya, M., Quinn, A., Wilson, D. & Maldonado, J. 2013. Taxonomic revision of the olingos (Bassaricyon), with description of a new species, the Olinguito. ZooKeys 324: 1–83.
Lagothrix lugens defleri	Primates	Mantilla-Meluk	2013	Colombia	Mantilla-Meluk, H. 2013. Subspecific Variation: An Alternative Biogeographic Hypothesis Explaining Variation in Coat Color and Cranial Morphology in Lagothrix lugens (Primates: Atelidae). Primate Conservation 26: 33–48
Lagothrix lugens sapiens	Primates	Mantilla-Meluk	2013	Colombia	Mantilla-Meluk, H. 2013. Subspecific Variation: An Alternative Biogeographic Hypothesis Explaining Variation in Coat Color and Cranial Morphology in Lagothrix lugens (Primates: Atelidae). Primate Conservation 26: 33–48
Murina guilleni nicobarensis	Chiroptera	Soisook, P., S. Karapan, C. Satasook, V. D. Thong, F. A. A. Khan, I. Maryanto, G. Csorba, N. Furey, B. Aul, and P. J. J. Bates	2013	India	Soisook, P., S. Karapan, C. Satasook, V. D. Thong, F. A. A. Khan, I. Maryanto, G. Csorba, N. Furey, B. Aul, and P. J. J. Bates. A review of the Murina cyclotis complex (Chiroptera: Vespertilionidae) with descriptions of a new species and subspecies. Acta Chiropterologica, 15(2): 271–292.
Cervus elaphus italicus	Artiodactyla	Zachos, Mattioli, Ferretti & Lorenzini	2014	Italy	Zachos, F.; Mattioli, S.; Ferretti, F.; Lorenzini, R. (2014). "The unique Mesola red deer of Italy: taxonomic recognition (Cervus elaphus italicus nova ssp., Cervidae) would endorse conservation". Italian Journal of Zoology. 81 (1): 136–143. doi:10.1080/11250003.2014.895060.
Petrogale brachyotis victoriae	Diprodontia	Potter, Close, Taggart, Cooper & Eldridge	2014	Australia	Potter, S.; Close, R.; Taggart, D.A.; Cooper, S.J.; Eldridge, M. (2014). "Taxonomy of rock-wallabies, Petrogale (Marsupialia: Macropodidae). IV. Multifaceted study of the brachyotis group identifies additional taxa". Australian Journal of Zoology. 62 (5): 401–414. doi:10.1071/ZO13095. S2CID 84985950.
Murina lorelieae ngoclinhensis	Chiroptera	Tu, Cornette, Utge & Hassanin	2015	Vietnam	Tu, V.T.; Cornette, R.; Utge, J.; Hassanin, A. (2014). "First record of Murina lorelieae (Chiroptera: Vespertilionidae) from Vietnam". Mammalia. 79: 201–213. doi:10.1515/mammalia-2013-0101. S2CID 84523571.
Ochotona mantchurica loukashkini	Lagomorpha	Lissovsky	2015	China	Lissovsky, A.A. (2015). "A new subspecies of Manchurian pika Ochotona mantchurica (Lagomorpha, Ochotonidae) from the Lesser Khinggan Range, China". Russian Journal of Theriology. 14 (2): 145–152. doi:10.15298/rusjtheriol.14.2.03.
Phascogale tapoatafa kimberleyensis	Dasyuromorphia	Aplin & Rhind	2015	Australia	Aplin, K.P.; Rhind, S.G.; Ten Have, J.; Chesser, R.T. (2015). "Taxonomic revision of Phascogale tapoatafa (Meyer, 1793) (Dasyuridae; Marsupialia), including descriptions of two new subspecies and confirmation of P. pirata Thomas, 1904 as a 'Top End' endemic". Zootaxa. 4055 (1): 1–73. doi:10.11646/zootaxa.4055.1.1. PMID 26701461. S2CID 25660684.
Phascogale tapoatafa wambenger	Dasyuromorphia	Rhind & Aplin	2015	Australia	Aplin, K.P.; Rhind, S.G.; Ten Have, J.; Chesser, R.T. (2015). "Taxonomic revision of Phascogale tapoatafa (Meyer, 1793) (Dasyuridae; Marsupialia), including descriptions of two new subspecies and confirmation of P. pirata Thomas, 1904 as a 'Top End' endemic". Zootaxa. 4055 (1): 1–73. doi:10.11646/zootaxa.4055.1.1. PMID 26701461. S2CID 25660684.
Plagiodontia aedium bondi	Rodentia	Turvey, Hansford, Kennerly, Nuñez-Miño, Brocca & Young	2015	Hispaniola	Turvey, S.T.; Hansford. J.; Kennerley, R.J.; Nuñez-Miño, J.M.; Brocca, J.L.; Young, R.P. (2015). "A new subspecies of hutia (Plagiodontia, Capromyidae, Rodentia) from southern Hispaniola". Zootaxa. 3957 (2): 201–214. doi:10.11646/zootaxa.3957.2.4. PMID 26249066. S2CID 30980481.
Rhinolophus francisi thailandicus	Chiroptera	Soisook & Bates	2015	Thailand	Soisook P; Struebig M; Noerfahmy S; Bernard H; Maryanto I; Chen SF; Rossiter SJ; Kuo HC; Deshpande K; Bates PJJ; Sykes D; Miguez RP (2015). "Description of a new species of the Rhinolophus trifoliatus-group (Chiroptera: Rhinolophidae) from Southeast Asia". Acta Chiropterologica. 17 (1): 21–36. doi:10.3161/15081109ACC2015.17.1.002. S2CID 83470278.
Sousa chinensis taiwanensis	Cetacea	Wang, Yang & Hung	2015	Taiwan	John Y Wang, Shih Chu Yang and Samuel K Hung (2015). "Diagnosability and Description of A New Subspecies of Indo-Pacific Humpback Dolphin, Sousa chinensis (Osbeck, 1765), from the Taiwan Strait". Zoological Studies. 54: e36. doi:10.1186/s40555-015-0115-x. PMC 6661429. PMID 31966123.

== See also ==
- List of mammals described in the 2000s
