= List of miniopterids =

Species in mammal family Miniopteridae

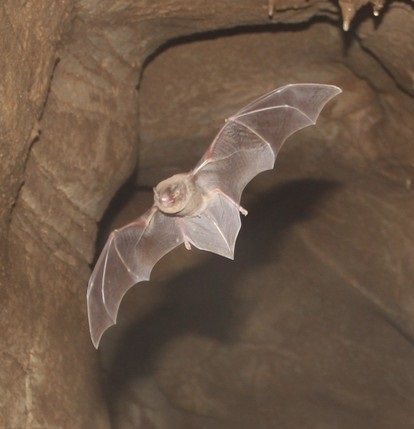
Common bent-wing bat (Miniopterus schreibersii )

Miniopteridae is one of the twenty families of bats in the mammalian order Chiroptera and part of the Yangochiroptera suborder. A member of this family is called a miniopterid, a bent-winged bat, or long winged bat. They are found in Europe, Africa, Asia, and Australia, primarily in caves, forests, shrubland, and grasslands, though some species can also be found in deserts or rocky areas. They range in size from the Shortridge's long-fingered bat, at 3 cm (1 in) plus a 3 cm (1 in) tail, to the great bent-winged bat, at 8 cm (3 in) plus a 7 cm (3 in) tail. Like all bats, miniopterids are capable of true and sustained flight, and have forearm lengths ranging from 3 cm (1 in) for many species to 6 cm (2 in) in the western bent-winged bat. They are all insectivorous and eat a variety of insects and spiders. No miniopterids have population estimates, though two species—the Loyalty bent-winged bat and Southeast Asian long-fingered bat—are categorized as endangered species.

The 41 extant species of Miniopteridae are all included in a single genus, Miniopterus. A few extinct prehistoric miniopterid species have been discovered, though due to ongoing research and discoveries the exact number and categorization is not fixed.

== Conventions ==
IUCN Red List categories
Conservation status
- EX: Extinct (0 species)
- EW: Extinct in the wild (0 species)
- CR: Critically endangered (0 species)
- EN: Endangered (2 species)
- VU: Vulnerable (1 species)
- NT: Near threatened (2 species)
- LC: Least concern (19 species)

Other categories
- DD: Data deficient (7 species)
- NE: Not evaluated (10 species)

The author citation for the species or genus is given after the scientific name; parentheses around the author citation indicate that this was not the original taxonomic placement. Conservation status codes listed follow the International Union for Conservation of Nature (IUCN) Red List of Threatened Species. Range maps are provided wherever possible; if a range map is not available, a description of the miniopterid's range is provided. Ranges are based on the IUCN Red List for that species unless otherwise noted.

== Classification ==
The family Miniopteridae consists of a single genus, Miniopterus, containing 41 extant species.

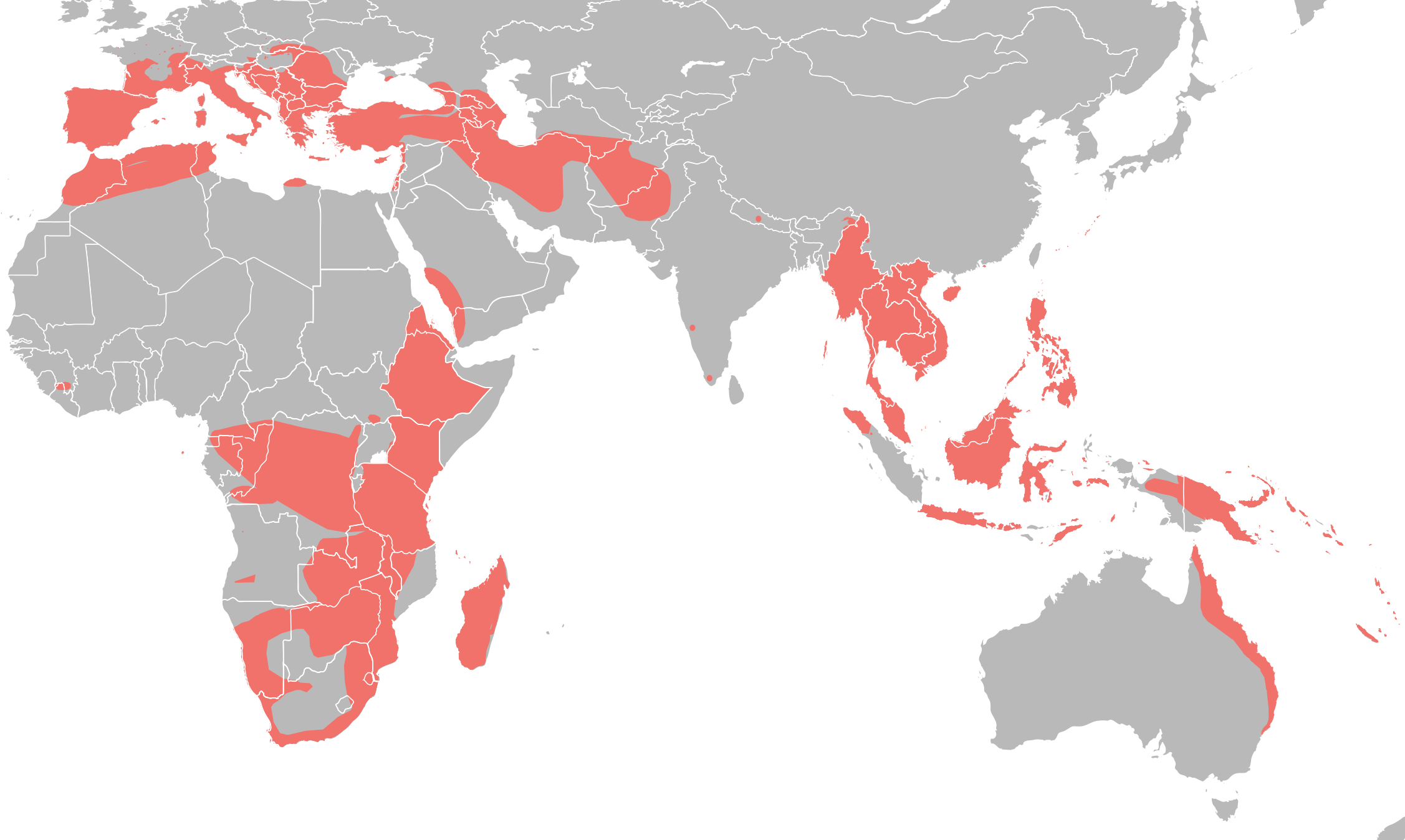
Miniopteridae distribution

== Miniopterids ==
The following classification is based on the taxonomy described by the reference work Mammal Species of the World (2005), with augmentation by generally accepted proposals made since using molecular phylogenetic analysis, as supported by both the IUCN SSC Bat Specialist Group and the American Society of Mammalogists.

Genus Miniopterus – Bonaparte, 1837 – 41 species
Common name	Scientific name and subspecies	Range	Size and ecology	IUCN status and estimated population
Aellen's long-fingered bat	M. aelleni Goodman, Maminirina, Friedli-Weyeneth, Bradman, Christidis, Ruedi, & Appleton, 2010	Northern Madagascar	Size: 4–5 cm (2 in), plus 3–5 cm (1–2 in) tail 3–4 cm (1–2 in) forearm length Habitat: Forest	LC Unknown
African long-fingered bat	M. africanus Sanborn, 1936	Kenya	Size: Unknown length 4–5 cm (2 in) forearm length Habitat: Forest	DD Unknown
Australasian bent-wing bat	M. orianae Thomas, 1922	Australia	Size: 4–7 cm (2–3 in), plus 4–6 cm (2 in) tail 4–5 cm (2 in) forearm length Habitat: Forest, shrubland, grassland, and caves	NE Unknown
Common bent-wing bat	M. schreibersii (Kuhl, 1817) Eleven subspecies: M. s. bassanii (Southern bent-wing bat); M. s. blepotis; M. s. chinensis; M. s. dasythrix; M. s. eschscholtzii; M. s. haradai; M. s. japoniae; M. s. orsinii; M. s. parvipes; M. s. schreibersii; M. s. smitianus	Europe, northern Africa, and western Asia	Size: 5–6 cm (2 in), plus 5–7 cm (2–3 in) tail 4–5 cm (2 in) forearm length Habitat: Forest, shrubland, grassland, and caves	VU Unknown
Eastern bent-wing bat	M. fuliginosus Hodgson, 1835	Asia	Size: About 4–7 cm (2–3 in), plus about 4–7 cm (2–3 in) tail 4–5 cm (2 in) forearm length Habitat: Forest, shrubland, grassland, and caves	NE Unknown
Eger's long-fingered bat	M. egeri Goodman, Ramasindrazana, Maminirina, Schoeman, & Appleton, 2011	Eastern Madagascar	Size: 4–6 cm (2 in), plus 4–5 cm (2 in) tail 3–4 cm (1–2 in) forearm length Habitat: Forest	LC Unknown
Eschscholtz's bent-winged bat	M. eschscholtzii Waterhouse, 1845	Philippines	Size: About 6 cm (2 in), plus 4–6 cm (2 in) tail 4–5 cm (2 in) forearm length Habitat: Forest, shrubland, grassland, and caves	NE Unknown
Glen's long-fingered bat	M. gleni Peterson, Egar, & Mitchell, 1995	Madagascar	Size: About 7 cm (3 in), plus 5–7 cm (2–3 in) tail 4–5 cm (2 in) forearm length Habitat: Caves and forest	LC Unknown
Great bent-winged bat	M. tristis (Waterhouse, 1845) Five subspecies: M. t. celebensis; M. t. grandis; M. t. insularis; M. t. propritristis; M. t. tristis	Southeastern Asia	Size: 6–8 cm (2–3 in), plus 5–7 cm (2–3 in) tail 4–6 cm (2 in) forearm length Habitat: Caves and forest	LC Unknown
Greater long-fingered bat	M. inflatus Thomas, 1903	Scattered Sub-Saharan Africa	Size: 5–7 cm (2–3 in), plus 4–6 cm (2 in) tail 4–5 cm (2 in) forearm length Habitat: Forest and caves	LC Unknown
Griffith's long-fingered bat	M. griffithsi Goodman, Maminirina, Bradman, Christidis, & Appleton, 2010	Southern Madagascar	Size: 6–7 cm (2–3 in), plus 5–7 cm (2–3 in) tail 4–5 cm (2 in) forearm length Habitat: Forest and shrubland	DD Unknown
Griveaud's long-fingered bat	M. griveaudi Harrison, 1959	Northern and western Madagascar	Size: 5–6 cm (2 in), plus 3–5 cm (1–2 in) tail 3–4 cm (1–2 in) forearm length Habitat: Unknown	DD Unknown
Intermediate long-fingered bat	M. medius Thomas & Wroughton, 1909	Southeastern Asia	Size: 4–6 cm (2 in), plus 4–6 cm (2 in) tail 4–5 cm (2 in) forearm length Habitat: Forest and caves	LC Unknown
Least long-fingered bat	M. minor Peters, 1866 Two subspecies: M. m. minor; M. m. occidentalis	Western and eastern Africa	Size: 5–6 cm (2 in), plus 3–5 cm (1–2 in) tail 3–5 cm (1–2 in) forearm length Habitat: Unknown	DD Unknown
Lesser long-fingered bat	M. fraterculus Thomas & Schwann, 1906	Southeastern Africa	Size: 4–6 cm (2 in), plus 3–6 cm (1–2 in) tail 4–5 cm (2 in) forearm length Habitat: Forest, savanna, shrubland, grassland, and caves	LC Unknown
Little bent-wing bat	M. australis Tomes, 1858 Three subspecies: M. a. australis; M. a. solomonensis; M. a. tibialis	Southeastern Asia and eastern Australia	Size: 3–5 cm (1–2 in), plus 3–5 cm (1–2 in) tail 3–5 cm (1–2 in) forearm length Habitat: Forest and caves	LC Unknown
Loyalty bent-winged bat	M. robustior Revilliod, 1914	New Caledonia	Size: 4–5 cm (2 in), plus 3–5 cm (1–2 in) tail 3–5 cm (1–2 in) forearm length Habitat: Forest and caves	EN Unknown
Madagascar long-fingered bat	M. brachytragos Goodman, Maminirina, Bradman, Christidis, & Appleton, 2009	Northern and western Madagascar	Size: 4–5 cm (2 in), plus 3–5 cm (1–2 in) tail 3–4 cm (1–2 in) forearm length Habitat: Forest and rocky areas	LC Unknown
Maghrebian bent-wing bat	M. maghrebensis Puechmaille, Allegrini, Benda, Gürün, Srámek, Ibañez, Juste, & Bilgin, 2014	Northwestern Africa	Size: About 6 cm (2 in), plus about 6 cm (2 in) tail 4–5 cm (2 in) forearm length Habitat: Forest and shrubland	NT Unknown
Mahafaly long-fingered bat	M. mahafaliensis Goodman, Maminirina, Bradman, Christidis, & Appleton, 2009	Southern Madagascar	Size: 4–5 cm (2 in), plus 3–5 cm (1–2 in) tail 3–4 cm (1–2 in) forearm length Habitat: Rocky areas, shrubland, and forest	LC Unknown
Major's long-fingered bat	M. majori Thomas, 1906	Madagascar	Size: 6–7 cm (2–3 in), plus 5–6 cm (2 in) tail 4–5 cm (2 in) forearm length Habitat: Forest and caves	LC Unknown
Manavi long-fingered bat	M. manavi Thomas, 1906	Central Madagascar	Size: About 5 cm (2 in), plus about 4 cm (2 in) tail 3–4 cm (1–2 in) forearm length Habitat: Forest, rocky areas, and caves	LC Unknown
Montagne d'Ambre long-fingered bat	M. ambohitrensis Goodman & Ramasindrazana, 2015	Northern Madagascar	Size: 5–6 cm (2 in), plus 4–5 cm (2 in) tail 3–5 cm (1–2 in) forearm length Habitat: Forest	LC Unknown
Mozambique long-fingered bat	M. mossambicus Monadjem, Goodman, Stanley, & Appleton, 2013	Southeastern Africa	Size: 5–6 cm (2 in), plus 4–6 cm (2 in) tail 4–5 cm (2 in) forearm length Habitat: Caves and forest	NE Unknown
Natal long-fingered bat	M. natalensis Smith, 1834	Southern and eastern Africa and Arabian Peninsula	Size: 5–7 cm (2–3 in), plus 4–6 cm (2 in) tail 4–5 cm (2 in) forearm length Habitat: Savanna, shrubland, caves, and desert	LC Unknown
Newton's long-fingered bat	M. newtoni Bocage, 1889	São Tomé and Príncipe	Size: About 5 cm (2 in), plus about 4 cm (2 in) tail 3–4 cm (1–2 in) forearm length Habitat: Forest	DD Unknown
Nimba long-fingered bat	M. nimbae Monadjem, Shapiro, Richards, Karabulut, Crawley, Nielsen, Hansen, Bohmann, & Mourier, 2020	Guinea and Liberia	Size: 6–7 cm (2–3 in), plus 4–6 cm (2 in) tail 4–5 cm (2 in) forearm length Habitat: Forest and caves	NE Unknown
Pale bent-wing bat	M. pallidus Thomas, 1907	Western Asia	Size: 5–7 cm (2–3 in), plus 5–7 cm (2–3 in) tail 4–5 cm (2 in) forearm length Habitat: Caves and desert	NT Unknown
Peterson's long-fingered bat	M. petersoni Goodman, Bradman, Maminirina, Ryan, Christidis, & Appleton, 2008	Southeastern Madagascar	Size: 4–5 cm (2 in), plus 3–5 cm (1–2 in) tail 3–5 cm (1–2 in) forearm length Habitat: Forest	DD Unknown
Philippine long-fingered bat	M. paululus Hollister, 1913	Southeastern Asia	Size: 4–6 cm (2 in), plus 3–5 cm (1–2 in) tail 3–4 cm (1–2 in) forearm length Habitat: Forest and caves	LC Unknown
Phillips's long-fingered bat	M. phillipsi Thomas, 1922	India and Sri Lanka	Size: 3–5 cm (1–2 in), plus 4–6 cm (2 in) tail 3–5 cm (1–2 in) forearm length Habitat: Forest and caves	NE Unknown
Sandy long-fingered bat	M. arenarius Heller, 1912	Eastern Africa and Arabian Peninsula	Size: About 6 cm (2 in), plus about 5 cm (2 in) tail 4–5 cm (2 in) forearm length Habitat: Savanna, shrubland, caves, and desert	NE Unknown
Shortridge's long-fingered bat	M. shortridgei Laurie & Hill, 1957	Indonesia	Size: 3–5 cm (1–2 in), plus 3–5 cm (1–2 in) tail 3–4 cm (1–2 in) forearm length Habitat: Unknown	DD Unknown
Small bent-winged bat	M. pusillus Dobson, 1876	Southeastern Asia	Size: 3–5 cm (1–2 in), plus 4–6 cm (2 in) tail 3–5 cm (1–2 in) forearm length Habitat: Forest and caves	LC Unknown
Small melanesian long-fingered bat	M. macrocneme Revilliod, 1914	New Caledonia and New Guinea	Size: 4–5 cm (2 in), plus 4–6 cm (2 in) tail 3–5 cm (1–2 in) forearm length Habitat: Forest, shrubland, grassland, and caves	LC Unknown
Sororcula long-fingered bat	M. sororculus Goodman, Ryan, Maminirina, Fahr, Christidis, & Appleton, 2007	Madagascar	Size: 5–6 cm (2 in), plus 5–6 cm (2 in) tail 4–5 cm (2 in) forearm length Habitat: Savanna, shrubland, and rocky areas	LC Unknown
Southeast Asian long-fingered bat	M. fuscus Bonhote, 1902	Japan	Size: 4–6 cm (2 in), plus 5–6 cm (2 in) tail 4–5 cm (2 in) forearm length Habitat: Forest, inland wetlands, and caves	EN Unknown
Srini's bent-winged bat	M. srinii Srinivasulu & Srinivasulu, 2023	Southern India	Size: 3–5 cm (1–2 in), plus 3–5 cm (1–2 in) tail 3–5 cm (1–2 in) forearm length Habitat: Forest and caves	NE Unknown
Villiers's bent-winged bat	M. villiersi Aellen, 1956	Western Africa	Size: Unknown length, plus 4–6 cm (2 in) tail 4–5 cm (2 in) forearm length Habitat: Forest, shrubland, grassland, and caves	NE Unknown
Western bent-winged bat	M. magnater Sanborn, 1931 Two subspecies: M. m. macrodens; M. m. magnater	Southeastern Asia	Size: 5–8 cm (2–3 in), plus 5–7 cm (2–3 in) tail 4–6 cm (2 in) forearm length Habitat: Forest and caves	LC Unknown
Wilson's long-fingered bat	M. wilsoni Monadjem, Guyton, Naskrecki, Richards, Kropff, & Dalton, 2020	Southeastern Africa	Size: 4–6 cm (2 in), plus 4–6 cm (2 in) tail 4–5 cm (2 in) forearm length Habitat: Forest, savanna, shrubland, grassland, and caves	NE Unknown

== Sources ==
- Chernasky, Amy; Motis, Anna; Burgin, Connor, eds. (2023). All the Mammals of the World. Lynx Nature Books. ISBN 978-84-16728-66-4.
- Simmons, Nancy B. (2005). Wilson, Don E.; Reeder, DeeAnn M. (eds.). Mammal Species of the World. Vol. 1 (3rd ed.). Johns Hopkins University Press. ISBN 978-0-8018-8221-0.
- Nowak, Ronald M. (1994). Walker's Bats of the World. Johns Hopkins University Press. ISBN 978-0-8018-4986-2.
