= Miniopterus zapfei =

Miniopterus zapfei Temporal range: Middle Miocene (MN 7/8)

Conservation status
- Extinct

Scientific classification
- Kingdom: Animalia
- Phylum: Chordata
- Class: Mammalia
- Order: Chiroptera
- Family: Miniopteridae
- Genus: Miniopterus
- Species: †M. zapfei

Binomial name
- †Miniopterus zapfei Mein & Ginsburg, 2002

Extinct species of bat

Miniopterus zapfei is a fossil bat in the genus Miniopterus from the middle Miocene of France. First described in 2002, it is known only from the site of La Grive M, where it occurs with another fossil Miniopterus species, the smaller and more common Miniopterus fossilis. M. zapfei is known from five mandibles (lower jaws) and an isolated fourth upper premolar (P4). The fourth lower premolar is more slender than in M. fossilis and the cingulum shelf surrounding the P4 is less well-developed than in living Miniopterus. The length of the first lower molar is 1.57 to 1.60 mm.

== Taxonomy ==
Miniopterus zapfei was described by Pierre Mein and Léonard Ginsburg in a 2002 paper on the ages and faunas of the fossil sites of La Grive-Saint-Alban in southeastern France. Mein and Ginsburg wrote that it was the second fossil Miniopterus species to be described, after Miniopterus fossilis from Slovakia, but did not mention Miniopterus approximatus from the Pliocene of Poland or Miniopterus tao from the Pleistocene of China. Another fossil species, Miniopterus rummeli, was described from the Miocene of Germany in 2003. The specific name, zapfei, honors Helmuth Zapfe, who described M. fossilis. Miniopterus also includes about 20 living species of small, insectivorous bats distributed in southern Eurasia, Africa, and Australia. Although the genus was historically placed in the family Vespertilionidae, it is now classified in its own family, Miniopteridae.

== Description ==
The known material (hypodigm) of Miniopterus zapfei includes a mandible (lower jaw) with the fourth premolar (p4), first molar (m1), and second molar (m2); a mandible with m1; a mandible with m1 and m2; a mandible with m2 and the third molar (m3); a mandible without any teeth; and an isolated fourth upper premolar (P4). Some of the mandibles also preserve the alveoli (openings) for teeth that have not been preserved. The dimensions of the p4 (length and width) are 1.03 x 0.88 mm; m1 is 1.57 to 1.60 x 1.01 to 1.07 mm; m2 is 1.51 to 1.64 x 0.95 to 1.05 mm; the single m3 is 1.41 mm long; and the single P4 is 1.38 x 1.52 mm. In a well-preserved mandible, the length from the alveolus for the first incisor to the end of m3 is 8.80 mm and the depth of the mandible at m1 is 1.50 mm. Miniopterus zapfei can be identified as a Miniopterus on the basis of the possession of three lower premolars (designated p2, p3, and p4, because the original first premolar has been lost); a two-rooted p3; and the nyctalodont molars, with the posterolophid (a crest at the back of the molar) behind the entoconid cusp. M. zapfei is about 30% larger than M. fossilis and has a more slender p4. Compared to living Miniopterus, the cingulum (shelf) that surrounds the P4 is less well-developed and the parastyle crest is weaker.

== Range and ecology ==
Miniopterus zapfei is known only from the site La Grive M in the village of Saint-Alban-de-Roche, department of Isère, southeastern France. La Grive M is one of several fissure filling sites in the area, collectively known as La Grive-Saint-Alban, which have yielded rich fossil faunas. La Grive M is the reference locality for the MN zone MN 7/8, about 13 to 11 million years ago. La Grive M is one of the older sites of La Grive, and Mein and Ginsburg proposed taking it as the reference locality for a separate zone MN 7. M. zapfei is rare in La Grive M; Miniopterus fossilis is much more common in the same site, and has also been found in La Grive L7 and other European localities ranging from MN 6 to MN 13.

== Literature cited ==
- Mein, P. and Ginsburg, L. 2002. Sur l'âge relatif des différents karstiques miocènes de La Grive-Saint-Alban (Isère). Cahiers scientifiques, Muséum d'Histoire naturelle, Lyon 2:7–47.
- Miller-Butterworth, C., Murphy, W., O'Brien, S., Jacobs, D., Springer, M. and Teeling, E. 2007. A family matter: Conclusive resolution of the taxonomic position of the long-fingered bats, Miniopterus. Molecular Biology and Evolution 24(7):1553–1561.
- Steininger, F. 1999. Chronostratigraphy, geochronology and biochronology of the Miocene "European Land Mammal Mega-Zones (ELMMZ)" and the Miocene "Mammal Zones (MN-Zones)". Pp. 9–24 in Rössner, G.E. and Heissig, K. (eds.). The Miocene Land Mammals of Europe. Munich: Verlag Dr. Friedrich Pfeil, 515 pp.
- Ziegler, R. 2003. Bats (Chiroptera, Mammalia) from Middle Miocene karstic fissure fillings of Petersbuch near Eichstätt, Southern Franconian Alb (Bavaria) (subscription required). Geobios 36(4):447–490.
