= Srini's bent-winged bat =

Conservation status
- Data Deficient (IUCN 3.1)

Scientific classification
- Kingdom: Animalia
- Phylum: Chordata
- Class: Mammalia
- Order: Chiroptera
- Family: Miniopteridae
- Genus: Miniopterus
- Species: M. srinii

Binomial name
- Miniopterus srinii Srinivasulu & Srinivasulu, 2023
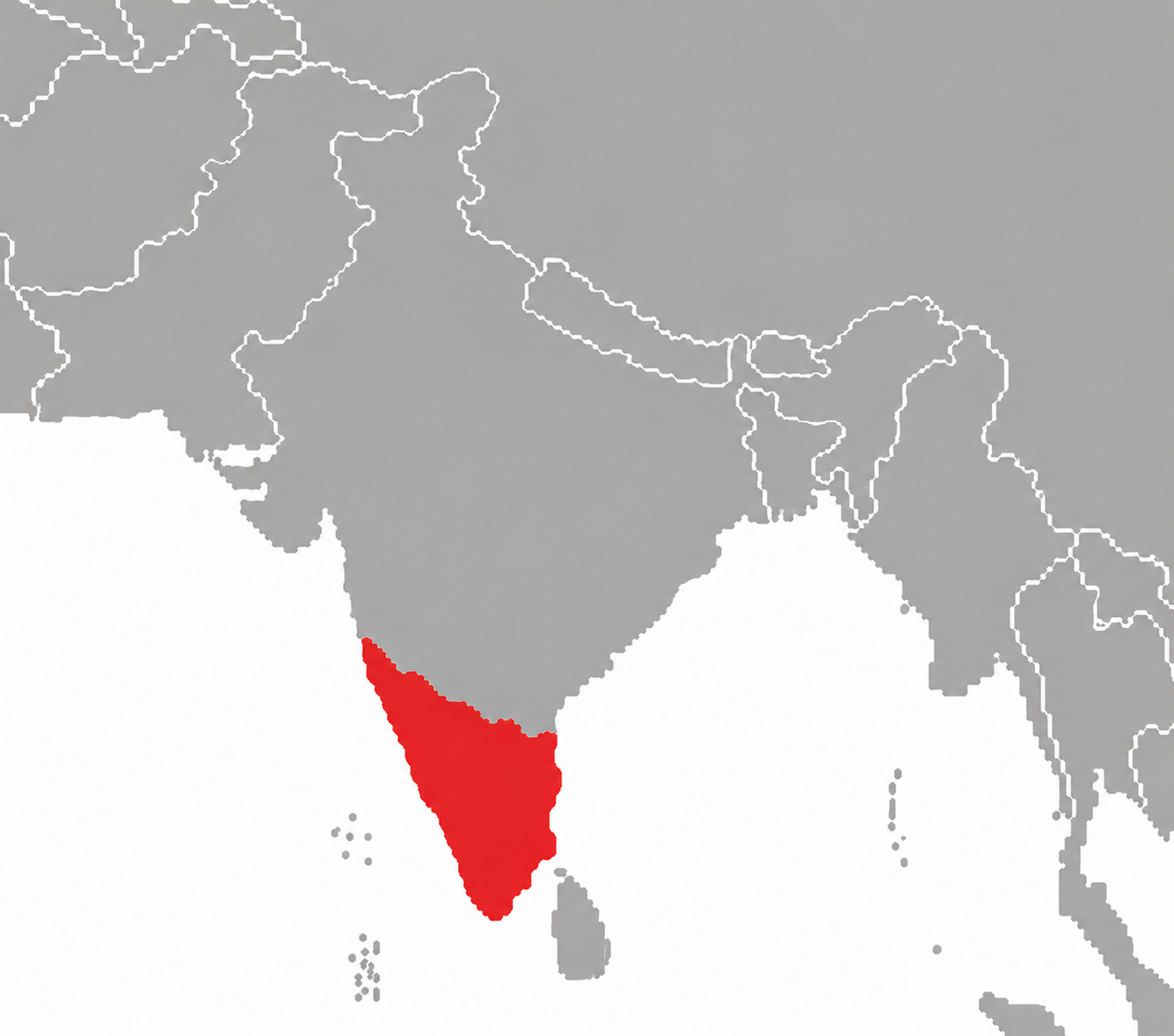
- Distribution of Miniopterous srinii

Species of bat

Srini's bent-winged bat (Miniopterus srinii), is a species of bat in the family Miniopteridae. It was formally described in 2023 from the Western Ghats of Karnataka, India, based on morphological, echolocation and molecular evidence. The species belongs to the Miniopterus australis species complex.

== Taxonomy ==
Miniopterus srinii is a species of bat in the family Miniopteridae and genus Miniopterus. It was formally described by Bhargavi Srinivasulu and Aditya Srinivasulu in 2023.The current taxonomic classification places M. srinii in the order Chiroptera, family Miniopteridae, and genus Miniopterus. It is currently recognised as a valid living species, with no synonyms listed in the Mammal Diversity Database. It was described as being closely similar to the small bent-winged bat (Miniopterus pusillus), but the authors found differences in morphology, craniodental measurements and echolocation characteristics that supported its recognition as a distinct species.

== Description ==
It is a small-sized bent-winged bat with a forearm length of 38.93–41.29 mm. Its fur ranges from deep golden to dark brown and is generally lighter than that of Miniopterus pusillus. The dorsal fur is relatively long, with golden and cream-coloured hairs interspersed with shorter black hairs, while the ventral fur is golden-tipped, dark brown in the middle and cream-coloured at the base. The muzzle is light grey to flesh-coloured and sparsely covered with hair.

The ears are small and triangular, with a relatively short, straight, parallel-sided tragus. The skull and mandible are relatively longer than those of M. pusillus, and the species has a broader and more rounded palatal emargination. Its external appearance is nevertheless very similar to M. pusillus, making the two species difficult to distinguish on external characters alone. The species is distinguished from closely related bats through a combination of morphological, craniodental and echolocation characteristics. Molecular analysis also revealed a genetic distance of approximately 10.84 ± 0.22% from M. pusillus, supporting its recognition as a distinct cryptic species.
