= Loyalty bent-winged bat =

Conservation status
- Endangered (IUCN 3.1)

Scientific classification
- Kingdom: Animalia
- Phylum: Chordata
- Class: Mammalia
- Order: Chiroptera
- Family: Miniopteridae
- Genus: Miniopterus
- Species: M. robustior

Binomial name
- Miniopterus robustior (Revilliod, 1914)

Species of bat

The Loyalty bent-winged bat (Miniopterus robustior) is a species of bent-winged bat. It is found only in New Caledonia.

== Taxonomy ==
The Loyalty bent-winged bat was described as a new taxon in 1914 by Swiss naturalist Pierre Revilliod. He believed it a subspecies of the little bent-wing bat, Miniopterus australis, and gave it the name M. australis robustior. The holotype had been collected by Swiss scientists Paul Sarasin and Jean Roux on the island of Lifou of the Loyalty Islands.

In 1980, Corbet and Hill published that they considered it a full species, M. robustior, which has largely been followed.

== Description ==
Males have forearm lengths of 39.5–40.5 mm (1.56–1.59 in) while females' are 39–42.2 mm (1.54–1.66 in). It has brown fur, with the belly a paler shade than the back.

== Biology and ecology ==
It is infrequently encountered. It is a colonial species, roosting in groups in caves. Colonies range in size from approximately 1000-1500 individuals, and cave roosts can include other bat species such as the little bent-winged bat and the Small Melanesian long-fingered bat. Its diet is not documented, but other bats in the family Miniopteridae consume soft-bodied insects captured in flight.

== Range and habitat ==
The Loyalty bent-winged bat is endemic to New Caledonia. It has a restricted range, and has only been found on Lifou Island and nearby Maré Island. There are only seven known caves that they use as roosts, which makes them highly susceptible to disturbance.
