= Peterson's long-fingered bat =

Conservation status
- Data Deficient (IUCN 3.1)

Scientific classification
- Kingdom: Animalia
- Phylum: Chordata
- Class: Mammalia
- Order: Chiroptera
- Family: Miniopteridae
- Genus: Miniopterus
- Species: M. petersoni

Binomial name
- Miniopterus petersoni Goodman et al., 2008
- Miniopterus petersoni range

Species of bat

Peterson's long-fingered bat (Miniopterus petersoni) is a bat in the genus Miniopterus which occurs in southeast Madagascar. It was described by Steven M. Goodman et al. in 2008. While M. petersoni is similar to M. sororculus, the two species are not closely related to each other, and possess a number of differing external and cranial characteristics.
