= Miniopterus ambohitrensis =

Scientific classification
- Kingdom: Animalia
- Phylum: Chordata
- Class: Mammalia
- Order: Chiroptera
- Family: Miniopteridae
- Genus: Miniopterus
- Species: M. ambohitrensis

Binomial name
- Miniopterus ambohitrensis Goodman & Ramasindrazana, 2015

Species of bat

Miniopterus ambohitrensis, also known as the Montagne d’Ambre long-fingered bat, is a species of bat in the family Miniopteridae found in Madagascar. Its common name is derived from the Montagne d’Ambre range, where it is found.

== Distribution and habitat ==
Miniopterus ambohitrensis is known from four localities in the northern and central portions of Madagascar, all of which are montane regions. The range of elevation for this species is 800-1600m. The calculated area of its habitat is 15,143 km^{2} . There is a possibility that the species is partially migratory.
