= Sandy long-fingered bat =

Scientific classification
- Kingdom: Animalia
- Phylum: Chordata
- Class: Mammalia
- Order: Chiroptera
- Family: Miniopteridae
- Genus: Miniopterus
- Species: M. arenarius

Binomial name
- Miniopterus arenarius Heller 1912

Species of bat

The sandy long-fingered bat (Miniopterus arenarius), also known as the sandy bent-winged bat, is a species of bat from the genus Miniopterus that is endemic to the Arabian Peninsula and East Africa. Initially in 1912 described as a subspecies of Miniopterus natalensis, the sandy long-fingered bat was elevated to its own species.

== Biology ==
The sandy long-fingered bat was described as a subspecies of Miniopterus natalensis in 1912 but was later elevated to its own species. It occurs in East and North African countries such as Kenya, Ethiopia, Somalia, South Sudan, as well as Middle Eastern countries including Saudi Arabia and Yemen.

Adults measure 55 mm (2.2 in) long with a 47 mm (1.9 in) tail. The fur has various shades of brown and black colors, with gray underparts. Compared to Miniopterus natalensis, the species has a shorter, lighter colored coat, though the two animals are equal in size.
