= Eger's long-fingered bat =

Conservation status
- Least Concern (IUCN 3.1)

Scientific classification
- Kingdom: Animalia
- Phylum: Chordata
- Class: Mammalia
- Order: Chiroptera
- Family: Miniopteridae
- Genus: Miniopterus
- Species: M. egeri

Binomial name
- Miniopterus egeri Goodman, Ramasindrazana, Maminirina, Schoeman & Appleton, 2011
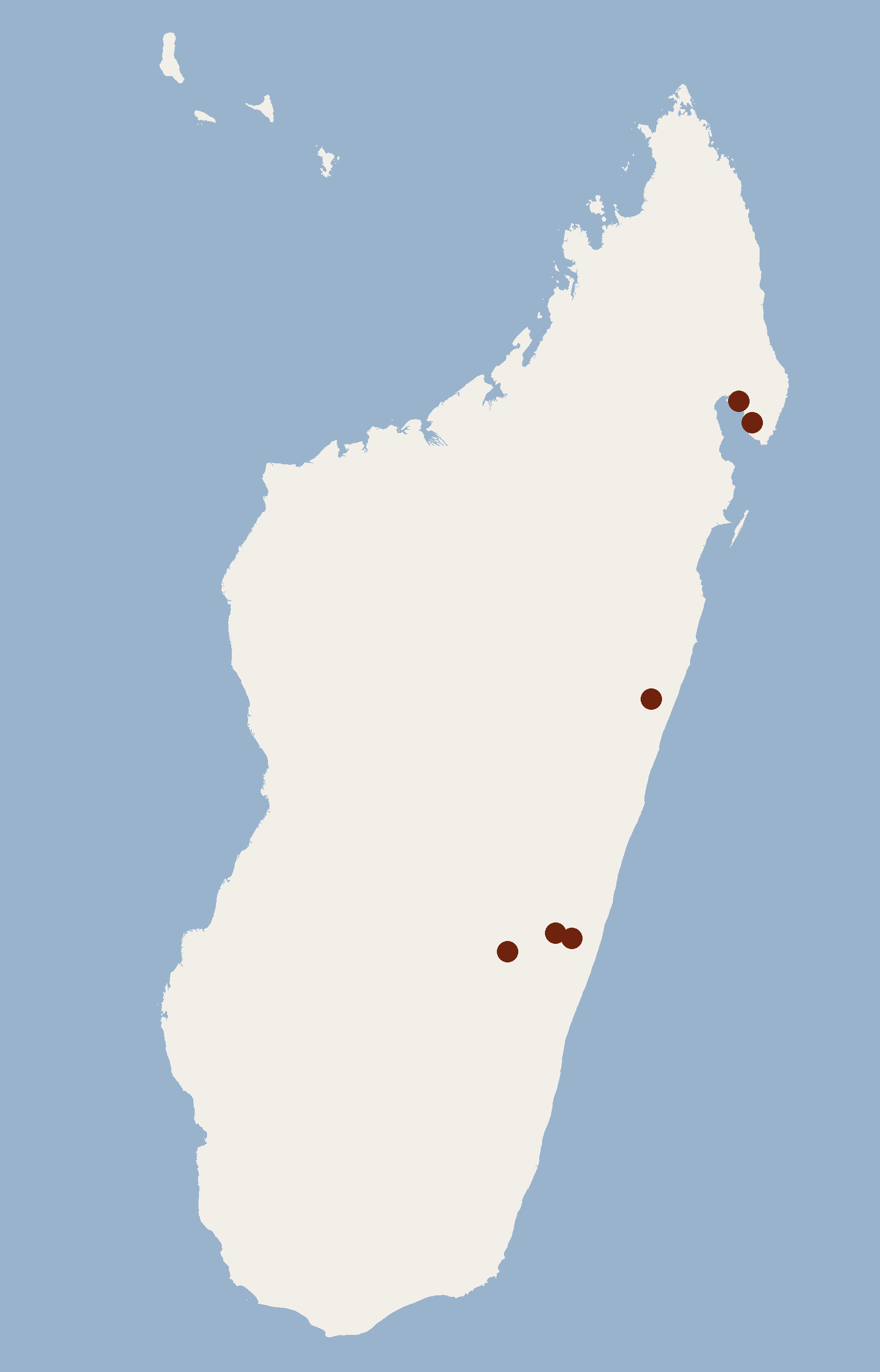

Species of bat

Eger's long-fingered bat (Miniopterus egeri) is a species of long-fingered bat found in Madagascar.

== Taxonomy ==
Eger's long-fingered bat was described as a new species in 2011 by Goodman et al. The eponym for the species name "egeri" is Judith Eger, Senior Curator of Royal Ontario Museum's Department of Mammalogy.

== Description ==
Eger's long-fingered bat is a relatively small member of its genus with a forearm length of 37–40 mm (1.5–1.6 in). Individuals weigh 4.2–7.6 g (0.15–0.27 oz). It has a dental formula of 2.1.2.33.1.3.3 for a total of 36 teeth.

== Range and status ==
Eger's long-fingered bat is endemic to Madagascar. It has been documented at a range of elevations, from 5–1,300 m (16–4,265 ft) above sea level. As of 2017, it is evaluated as a least-concern species by the IUCN.
