= Major's long-fingered bat =

Conservation status
- Least Concern (IUCN 3.1)

Scientific classification
- Kingdom: Animalia
- Phylum: Chordata
- Class: Mammalia
- Infraclass: Placentalia
- Order: Chiroptera
- Family: Miniopteridae
- Genus: Miniopterus
- Species: M. majori

Binomial name
- Miniopterus majori Thomas, 1906
- Major's long-fingered bat range

Species of bat

Major's long-fingered bat (Miniopterus majori) is a species of vesper bat in the family Miniopteridae. It is found only in Madagascar. It is similar to M. schreibersi of continental Africa, differing by having a shorter forearm, slightly longer digits and a narrow box-shaped skull. The pelage is often a greyish-brown colour, and the tragus is kidney-shaped and is a prominent feature. It is an insectivore and is viewed as a possible contributor to pest removal in Madagascar. The species was named in honour of Swiss zoologist C. I. Forsyth Major.

== Taxonomy ==
Miniopterus majori was described as a new species by Oldfield Thomas in 1906 with a type locality of Imasindrary, northeastern Betsileo, Madagascar. The holotype is held in the Natural History Museum, London.

The species is assigned to the genus Miniopterus. Molecular studies of Malagasy Miniopterus have recovered M. majori as part of a lineage containing M. gleni and M. griffithsi, supporting its placement among the long-fingered bats.

Historically, Miniopterus was placed within the family Vespertilionidae. Molecular research by provided evidence for recognising the long-fingered bats as a separate family, Miniopteridae.
