= Mozambique long-fingered bat =

Scientific classification
- Kingdom: Animalia
- Phylum: Chordata
- Class: Mammalia
- Order: Chiroptera
- Family: Miniopteridae
- Genus: Miniopterus
- Species: M. mossambicus

Binomial name
- Miniopterus mossambicus Monadjem, Goodman, Stanley & Appleton, 2013

Species of mammal

The Mozambique long-fingered bat (Miniopterus mossambicus) is a species of bat within the family Miniopteridae.

== Taxonomy ==
The species name mossambicus stands for the country the type series was collected in, Mozambique.

== Distribution ==
The Mozambique long-fingered bat's distribution is in Africa within countries such as Kenya, Namibia, Ethiopia, Zimbabwe, and other countries in East Africa at elevations of 420 to 1800 meters.

The holotype was collected in a mist net that was placed over a swimming pool at the Bamboo Inn, on the outskirts of Nampula, at an altitude of 420 meters. A paratype was also caught shortly afterwards in the same mist net settup.

== Behavior and ecology ==
The species is nocturnal and uses caves and mines during the day as roosts.
