= Philippine long-fingered bat =

Conservation status
- Least Concern (IUCN 3.1)

Scientific classification
- Kingdom: Animalia
- Phylum: Chordata
- Class: Mammalia
- Order: Chiroptera
- Family: Miniopteridae
- Genus: Miniopterus
- Species: M. paululus

Binomial name
- Miniopterus paululus Hollister, 1913
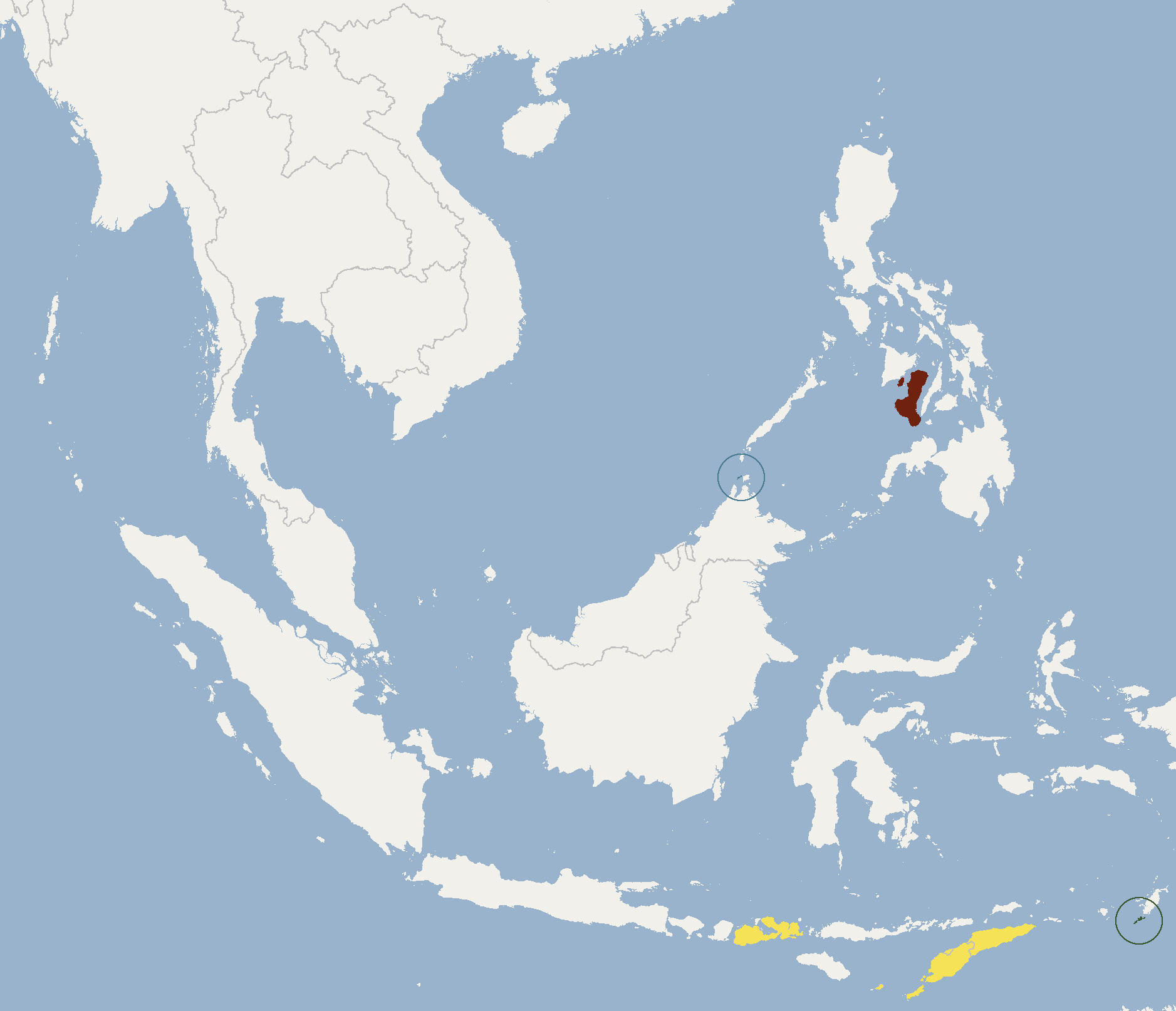

Species of bat

The Philippine long-fingered bat (Miniopterus paululus) is a species of bat from the family Miniopteridae. It is native to Indonesia, the Philippines, Malaysia, and Timor-Leste. Due to the dubious taxonomic status of the species, it has been suggested that it remain classified as a subspecies of the little bent-wing bat.
