= Miniopterus pallidus =

Conservation status
- Near Threatened (IUCN 3.1)

Scientific classification
- Kingdom: Animalia
- Phylum: Chordata
- Class: Mammalia
- Order: Chiroptera
- Family: Miniopteridae
- Genus: Miniopterus
- Species: M. pallidus

Binomial name
- Miniopterus pallidus Thomas, 1907

Species of bat

Miniopterus pallidus, the pale bent-wing bat, is a species of bat found in Middle-East. Until 2010, it was considered as a sub-species of M. schreibersii.

== Range and habitat ==
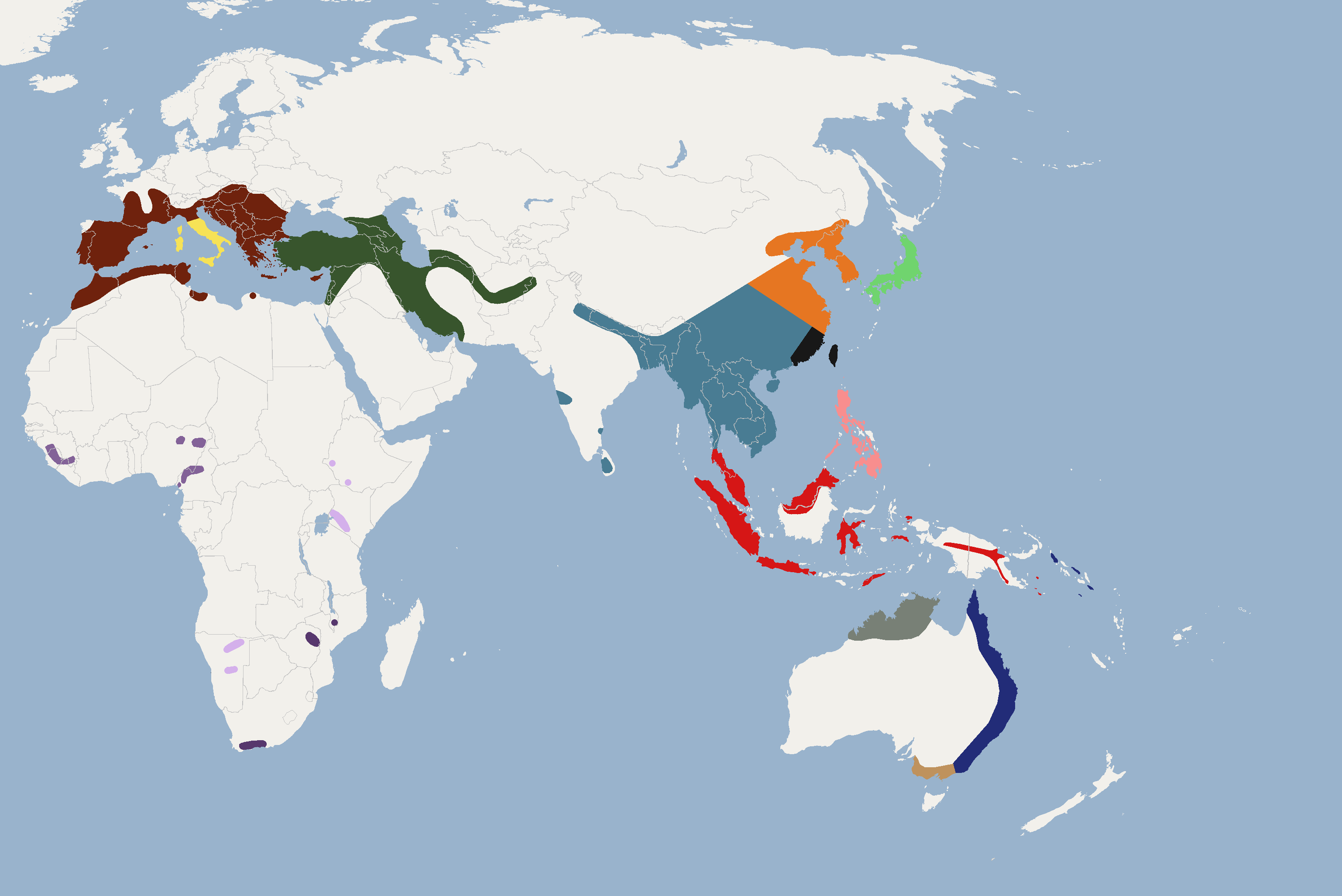
Distribution of Miniopterus schreibersii species complex

The species was clearly identified in Turkey, but Miniopterus schreibersii pallidus was also recorded in others countries in the Middle East, Caucasus, Iran, Afghanistan and Pakistan.

So far, the species was only recorded in caves, but it is possible that different type of underground roosts are used by this species during the year, as for Miniopterus schreibersii.

== Conservation ==
This species is listed in the Berne Convention and is specifically targeted by the UNEP-EUROBATS convention.

== Literature cited ==
- Bilgin, R., Gürün, K., Maraci, Ö., Furman, A., Hulva, P., Çoraman, E., Radekk, L., Bartonick, T., & Horáček, I. 2012. Syntopic occurrence in Turkey supports separate species status for Miniopterus schreibersii schreibersii and M. schreibersii pallidus (Mammalia: Chiroptera). Acta Chiropterologica, 14(2), 279-289.
- Furman, A., Postawa, T., Öztunç, T., & Çoraman, E. 2010. Cryptic diversity of the bent-wing bat, Miniopterus schreibersii (Chiroptera: Vespertilionidae), in Asia Minor. BMC evolutionary biology, 10(1), 121.
- Postawa, T., & Furman, A. 2014. Abundance patterns of ectoparasites infesting different populations of Miniopterus species in their contact zone in Asia Minor. Acta Chiropterologica, 16(2), 387-395.
