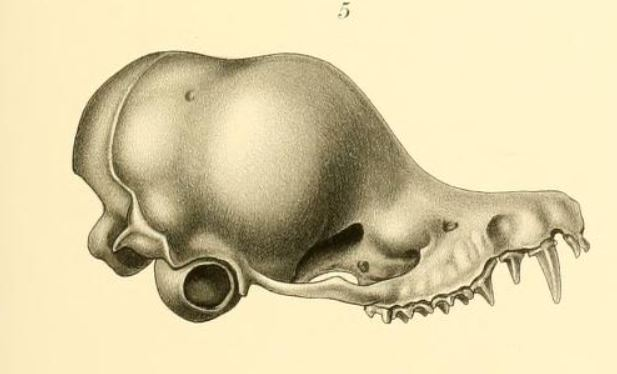

Conservation status
- Least Concern (IUCN 3.1)

Scientific classification
- Kingdom: Animalia
- Phylum: Chordata
- Class: Mammalia
- Infraclass: Placentalia
- Order: Chiroptera
- Family: Miniopteridae
- Genus: Miniopterus
- Species: M. macrocneme

Binomial name
- Miniopterus macrocneme Revilliod, 1914

= Miniopterus macrocneme =

Species of bat

Miniopterus macrocneme is a bat in the genus Miniopterus. It is found primarily in the Loyalty Islands of New Caledonia, though it is also found in New Guinea. It has been considered a subspecies of Miniopterus pusillus in recent years. It lives in caves in large numbers, though it can also be found in forests.

== Discovery ==
Miniopterus macrocneme was formally described by Pierre Revilliod in 1914 in Les mammifères de la Nouvelle-Calédonie et des Îles Loyalty, published as part of Nova Caledonia. The original description appeared on page 360 of volume 1. The species was described under its current name, Miniopterus macrocneme. The type series consists of six syntypes (NMB 1761–1766). These specimens were collected from New Caledonia and the Loyalty Islands, including localities on Lifou, Maré and mainland New Caledonia.
