= Lesser long-fingered bat =

Conservation status
- Least Concern (IUCN 3.1)

Scientific classification
- Kingdom: Animalia
- Phylum: Chordata
- Class: Mammalia
- Order: Chiroptera
- Family: Miniopteridae
- Genus: Miniopterus
- Species: M. fraterculus

Binomial name
- Miniopterus fraterculus Thomas & Schwann, 1906

Species of bat

The lesser long-fingered bat (Miniopterus fraterculus), also known as the black clinging bat or lesser bent-winged bat, is a species of vesper bat in the family Miniopteridae. It is found in western Southern Africa, south East Africa, and parts of Central Africa. Its natural habitats are temperate forests, temperate shrubland, and caves and other subterranean habitats.

It has been assessed as least-concern by the IUCN.

== Taxonomy ==
The currently recognized species is thought to be a complex of morphologically similar species. The reported population of this species from Madagascar is now allocated to the recently described M. sororculus.

== Biology ==
The species is insectivorous.

== Habitat and distribution ==
It is common and widespread throughout a number of small ranges across Africa. The bat is found in Democratic Republic of the Congo, Eswatini, Kenya, Malawi, Mozambique, Rwanda, South Africa, Tanzania, Uganda, Zambia, and Zimbabwe. The upper elevation limit for the bat is around 2,200 meters above sea level.

It is found in dry bushveld, lowveld, mistbelt, and forest habitats, where caves, tunnels, unused mines and railways, and rocky overhangs are present. In the KwaZulu-Natal it has been observed in damp sandstone caves, a solution cave of glacio-fluvial boulder clay, a rocky overhang over a forest stream, a rock fissure, a railway tunnel as well as from unused mine adits.

== Conservation ==
The species has been assessed as "least concern" by the IUCN Red List due to the lack of threats to the species and its large range. It is also presumed to have a large population. It is found in Tanzania's Manga Forest Reserve and is presumably also found in other protected areas across its range.
