= Miniopterus tao =

Miniopterus tao Temporal range: Pleistocene

Scientific classification
- Kingdom: Animalia
- Phylum: Chordata
- Class: Mammalia
- Infraclass: Placentalia
- Order: Chiroptera
- Family: Miniopteridae
- Genus: Miniopterus
- Species: M. tao

Binomial name
- Miniopterus tao Wołoszyn, 1986

Extinct species of bat

Miniopterus tao is a fossil bat in the genus Miniopterus from the Pleistocene of Zhoukoudian in China. It is known from a number of mandibles (lower jaws), which were initially identified as the living species Miniopterus schreibersii in 1963 before being recognized as a separate species, M. tao, in 1986. Miniopterus tao is larger than living M. schreibersii and has more closely spaced lower premolars and more robust talonids (back groups of cusps) on the lower molars. The back part of the mandible is relatively low and on it, the coronoid and condyloid processes are about equally high. The average length of the mandible is 12.0 mm.

== Taxonomy ==
In 1934, Chinese paleontologist C.C. Young was the first to describe fossil bats from the fossil site of Zhoukoudian Locality 1, which is famous for Peking Man. However, he did not mention Miniopterus, which was first recorded by Kazimierz Kowalski and Chuan-kuei Li in 1963 in a description of new material from layer 8 of the cave site. They identified the Miniopterus as the widespread living species Miniopterus schreibersii on the basis of 48 mandibles (lower jaws) from layer 8 and reassigned another mandible that had previously been identified as Myotis to Miniopterus. In a 1986 paper, however, Bronisław Wołoszyn described the population as a new species, Miniopterus tao, after examining two mandibles in the collections of the Polish Academy of Sciences. He did place the species in the "schreibersii group" of Miniopterus, but considered it unlikely to be ancestral to living M. schreibersii. The specific name, tao, refers to the Chinese philosophical concept, the Tao.

== Description ==
Wołoszyn described the species on the basis of two mandibles, one damaged and with the third premolar (p3) through third molar (m3), and the other intact and with the fourth premolar (p4) through second molar (m2). Miniopterus tao is a large member of the "schreibersii group" and about as large as Miniopterus rummeli from the Miocene of Germany. The mandible is robust and generally resembles M. schreibersii. The mental foramen (an opening at the outer side of the jaw) is located between the lower canine and second lower premolar (p2). The coronoid process (a projection at the back of the mandible) is low and rounded and is connected to the condyloid process behind it by a nearly horizontal ridge, which contains a slight raising at its back. Compared to M. schreibersii, the condyloid process is more slender, but the base of the angular process (at the lower back corner of the jaw) is more robust. In M. rummeli, the back part of the mandible is higher and the coronoid process is distinctly higher than the condyloid process.

The preserved alveoli show that p2 is about as large as p3, not smaller as in the "tristis group" of Miniopterus. The premolars in M. tao are placed closely together, which distinguishes the species from M. schreibersii and fossil European species, including M. rummeli. The p3 is robust and surrounded by a well-developed cingulum (shelf). The crown is trapezoid in shape. In p4, there is a clear cingulum at the front and labial (outer) margins. The crown is triangular and the back edge is straight, not saddle-shaped as in M. schreibersii. The molars resemble those of M. schreibersii, but are more robust, particularly the talonids (the cusp groups at the back of the teeth). The total length of the mandible ranges from 11.6 to 12.4 mm and averages 12.0 mm in ten specimens, the coronoid process is 3.1 to 3.3 mm high, averaging 3.2 mm, and the length of the molar row is 4.0 to 4.4 mm, averaging 4.2 mm.

== Range ==
Miniopterus tao has only been recorded from Locality 1 at Zhoukoudian; Locality 3 contains a smaller Miniopterus identified as M. schreibersii. Locality 1 is Pleistocene in age (between about 2 million and 10,000 years old) and also contains Ia io and species of Rhinolophus and Myotis among bats, in addition to Homo erectus.

== Literature cited ==
- Kowalski, K. and Li, C.-K. 1963. Remarks on the fauna of bats (Chiroptera) from locality 1 at Choukoutien. Vertebrata PalAsiatica 7(2):144–150.
- Wołoszyn, B.W. 1986. A new species of long-winged bat Miniopterus tao sp. n. (Mammalia: Chiroptera) from locality 1 at Choukoutien, China. Acta Universitatis Carolinae, Geologica 1986(2):205–211.
- Ziegler, R. 2003. Bats (Chiroptera, Mammalia) from Middle Miocene karstic fissure fillings of Petersbuch near Eichstätt, Southern Franconian Alb (Bavaria) (subscription required). Geobios 36(4):447–490.
