= Southeast Asian long-fingered bat =

Conservation status
- Endangered (IUCN 3.1)

Scientific classification
- Kingdom: Animalia
- Phylum: Chordata
- Class: Mammalia
- Order: Chiroptera
- Family: Miniopteridae
- Genus: Miniopterus
- Species: M. fuscus

Binomial name
- Miniopterus fuscus Bonhote, 1902

Species of bat

The Southeast Asian long-fingered bat (Miniopterus fuscus) is a species of vesper bat in the family Miniopteridae. It is endemic to Japan and has been assessed as endangered by the IUCN.

== Description and biology ==
The bat has an average body mass of 10.8 grams (0.38 oz) and a forearm length of 41.5 millimetres (1.63 in). Females give birth to a single young in early June. The species forages over forests and mainly feeds on butterflies, moths, Hymenoptera, and flies.

== Habitat and distribution ==
The species is found in Amami-Oshima, Tokuno-shima, Okinoerabu Island, Okinawa Island, Kume Island, Ishigaki, and Iriomote Island in Japan. It was collected from the Kii peninsula in Honshu in 1933, but is now considered extinct there.

It inhabits forests and roosts in mines and caves, in colonies of several hundred individuals. There were large maternity colonies in the past, but these have become rare. There is a colony of 10,000 females on Okinawa Island.

== Conservation ==
The species has been assessed as endangered by the IUCN Red List due to its small area of inhabitance, degradation of its habitat, and disturbance of caves where it roosts. Some caves roosted by this species are lined with electricity for tourism and also face development near the caves. A new airport has been constructed nearby on Ishigaki Island above several caves frequented by these bats. It does not occur in any protected areas.
