= Intermediate long-fingered bat =

Conservation status
- Least Concern (IUCN 3.1)

Scientific classification
- Kingdom: Animalia
- Phylum: Chordata
- Class: Mammalia
- Order: Chiroptera
- Family: Miniopteridae
- Genus: Miniopterus
- Species: M. medius

Binomial name
- Miniopterus medius Thomas & Wroughton, 1909
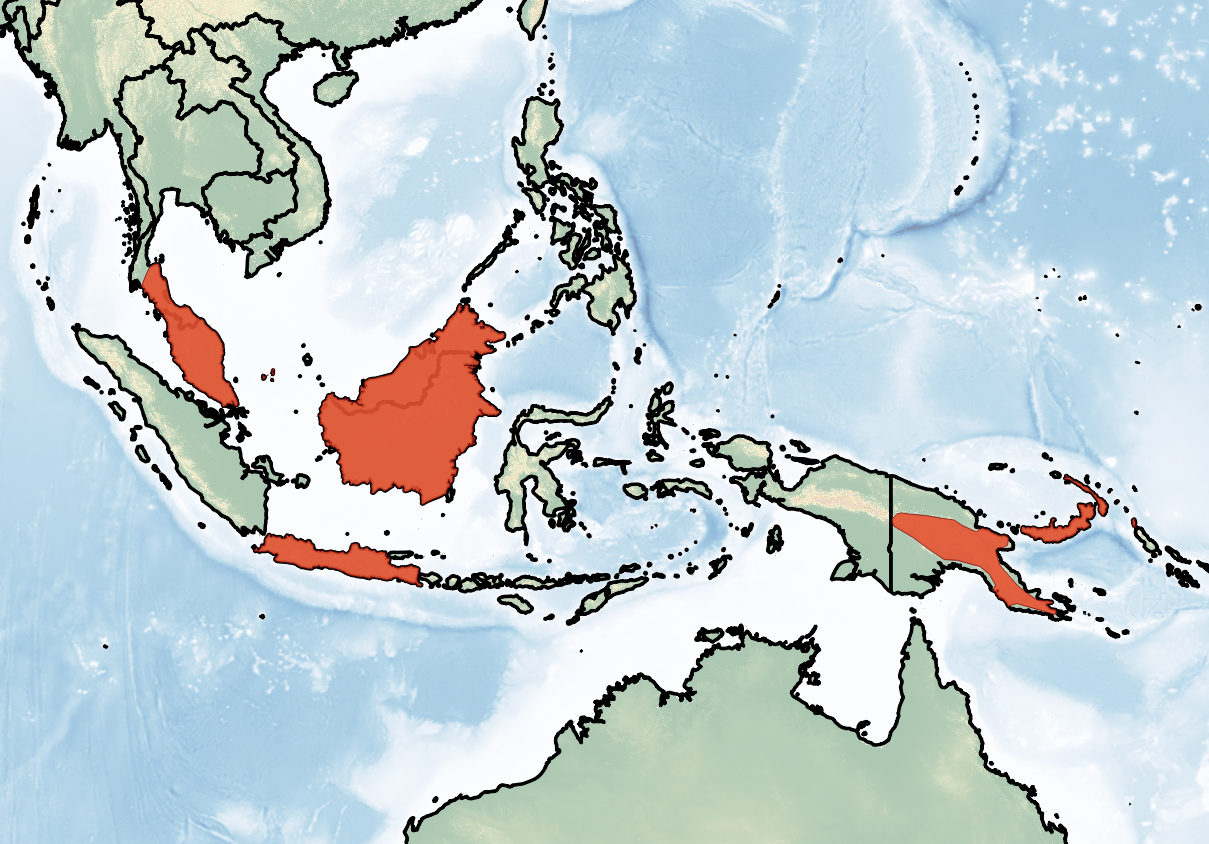

Species of bat

The intermediate long-fingered bat (Miniopterus medius) is a species of vesper bat in the family Miniopteridae. It can be found in Indonesia (Jawa, Kalimantan, Sulawesi), Malaysia, and Thailand and possibly also in Papua New Guinea and the Solomon Islands,
