= Great bent-winged bat =

Conservation status
- Least Concern (IUCN 3.1)

Scientific classification
- Kingdom: Animalia
- Phylum: Chordata
- Class: Mammalia
- Order: Chiroptera
- Family: Miniopteridae
- Genus: Miniopterus
- Species: M. tristis

Binomial name
- Miniopterus tristis (Waterhouse, 1845)
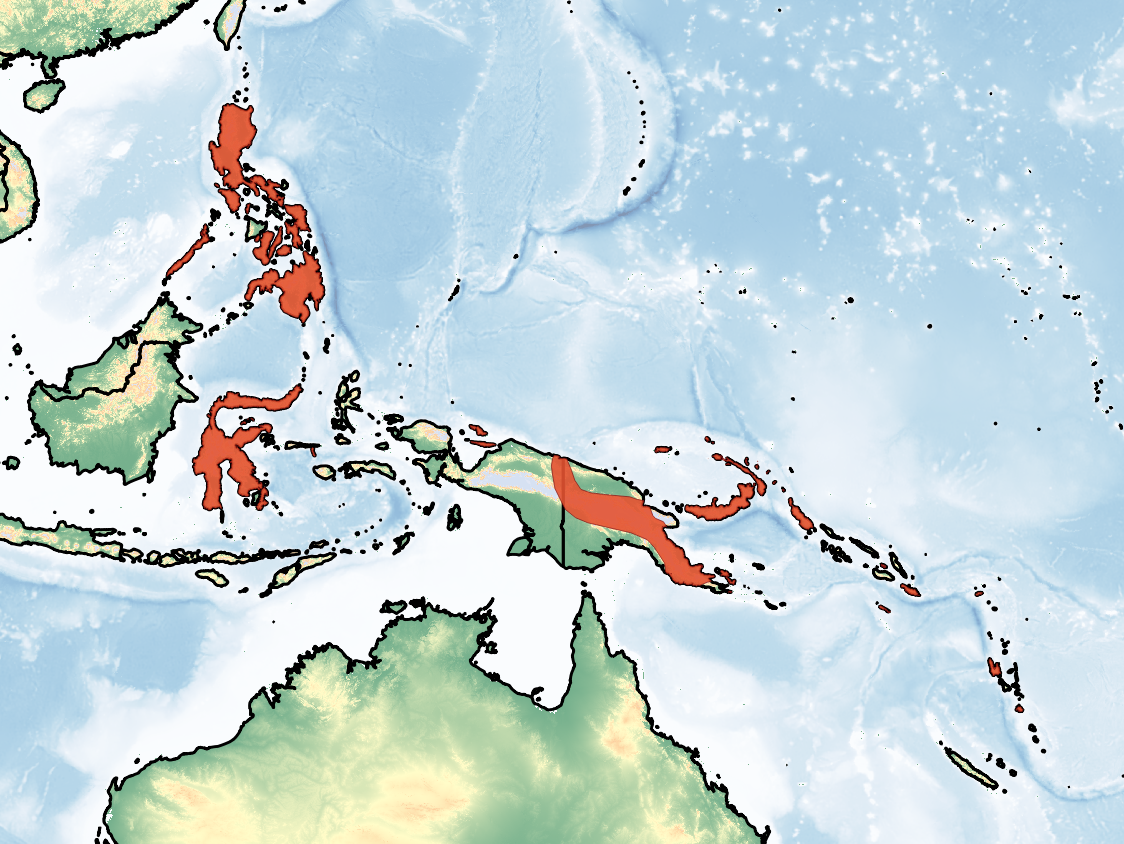

Synonyms
- Vespertilio tristis Waterhouse, 1845

Species of bat

The great bent-winged bat (Miniopterus tristis) is a species of vesper bat in the family Miniopteridae. It can be found in Indonesia, Papua New Guinea, Philippines, Solomon Islands, and Vanuatu.
