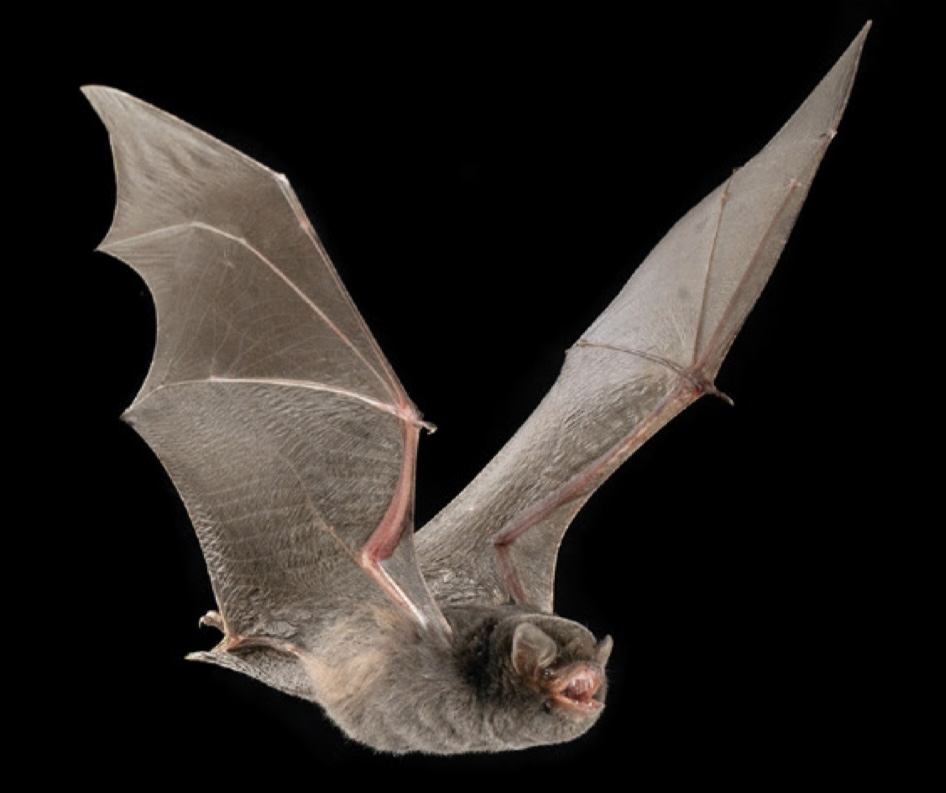

Scientific classification
- Kingdom: Animalia
- Phylum: Chordata
- Class: Mammalia
- Order: Chiroptera
- Family: Miniopteridae
- Genus: Miniopterus
- Species: M. wilsoni

Binomial name
- Miniopterus wilsoni Monadjem, Guiton, Naskrecki, Richards, Kropff & Dalton, 2020

= Wilson's long-fingered bat =

Species of bat

Wilson's long-fingered bat (Miniopterus wilsoni) is a species of bat described in 2020 from Gorongosa National Park in Mozambique. The name M. wilsoni refers to American evolutionary biologist Edward O. Wilson. The species inhabits the mountains of central and northern Mozambique and southern Malawi.

== See also ==
- List of living mammal species described in the 2020s
