= Miniopterus fossilis =

Miniopterus fossilis Temporal range: Miocene

Scientific classification
- Domain: Eukaryota
- Kingdom: Animalia
- Phylum: Chordata
- Class: Mammalia
- Order: Chiroptera
- Family: Miniopteridae
- Genus: Miniopterus
- Species: †M. fossilis

Binomial name
- †Miniopterus fossilis Zapfe, 1950

Extinct species of bat

Miniopterus fossilis is a fossil bat in the genus Miniopterus. It existed in what is now Slovakia during the Miocene period. It was first named by Zapfe in 1950.
