= Javanese long-fingered bat =

Scientific classification
- Kingdom: Animalia
- Phylum: Chordata
- Class: Mammalia
- Order: Chiroptera
- Family: Miniopteridae
- Genus: Miniopterus
- Species: M. blepotis

Binomial name
- Miniopterus blepotis Bonaparte, 1837

Species of bat

The Javanese long-fingered bat (Miniopterus blepotis) is a species of bat from the Miniopterus genus native to Indonesia. It was once a subspecies of Miniopterus schreibersii but following mitochondrial DNA evidence it was elevated to its own species.

== Biology ==
Following mitochondrial DNA evidence the Javanese long-fingered bat was removed from the schreibersii complex and elevated from a subspecies of Miniopterus schreibersii to its own species. It is distributed across numerous islands in southeast Asia and Oceania in habitats including dry, secondary and tropical forests.

The Javanese long-fingered bat weighs about 8.8 to 15 g (0.31 to 0.53 oz) and measures 46 to 63 mm (1.8 to 2.5 in) long with a 39 to 62.5 mm (1.54 to 2.46 in) tail. Its forearms are relatively long and its legs are relatively short. In New Guinea, specimens have brownish tips on dark colored back fur, and dark extremities.

A nocturnal animal, the Javanese long-fingered bat is found in colonies, sometimes with other species, that settle in caves, tunnels or mines.
