= Phillips's long-fingered bat =

Scientific classification
- Kingdom: Animalia
- Phylum: Chordata
- Class: Mammalia
- Order: Chiroptera
- Family: Miniopteridae
- Genus: Miniopterus
- Species: M. phillipsi

Binomial name
- Miniopterus phillipsi Kusuminda et al., 2022
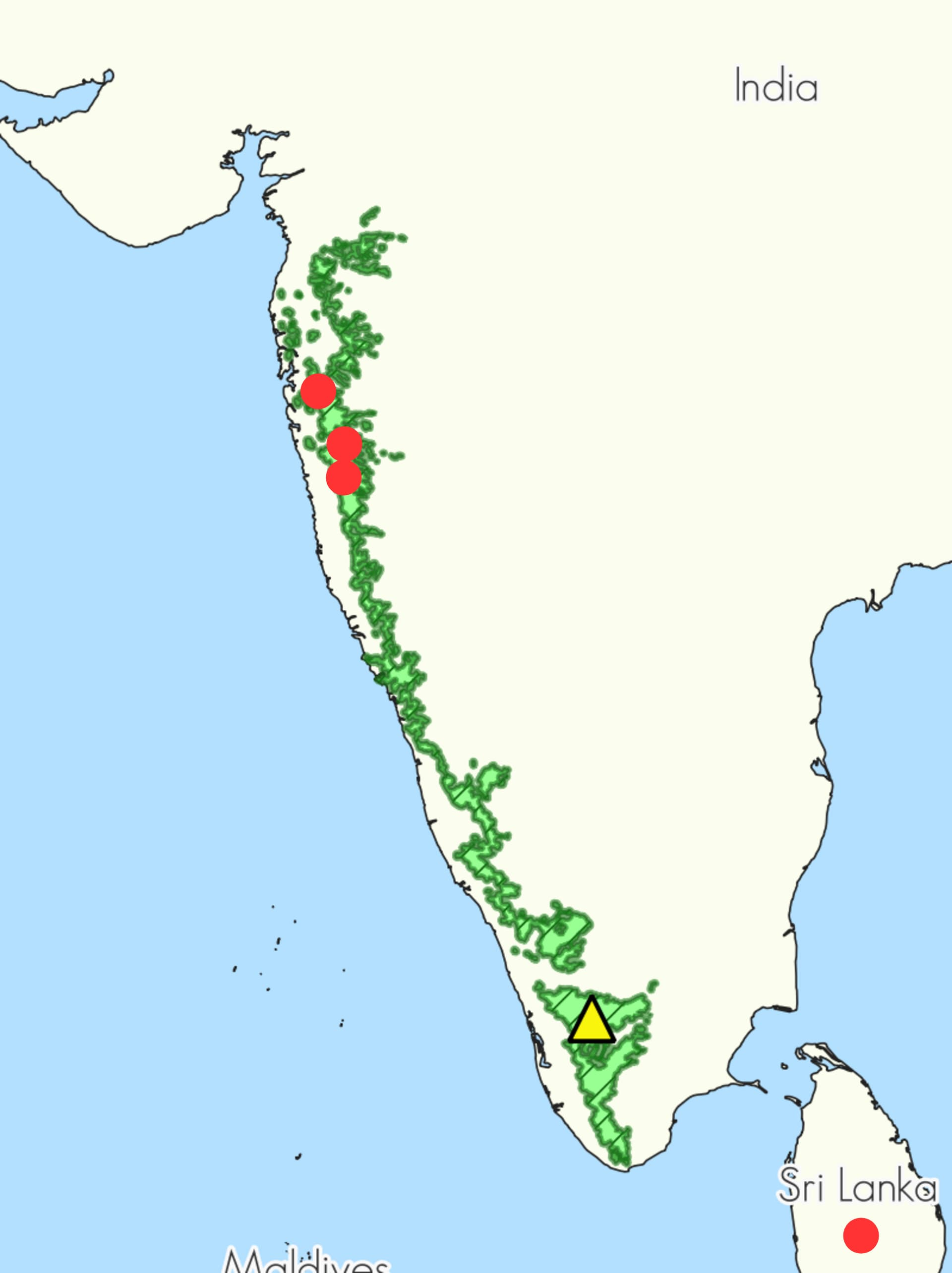
- Red circles indicate known distribution of Miniopterus phillips in the Western Ghats of India and Sri Lanka

Species of bat

Phillips's long-fingered bat (Miniopterus phillipsi) is a species of bat in the family Miniopteridae. It is endemic to the northern Western Ghats of India and was formally described in 2022 following morphological and molecular analyses that distinguished it from other members of the genus Miniopterus. The species was discovered from evergreen forests in the Mahabaleshwar region of Maharashtra. It is named in honour of the British–Sri Lankan naturalist W. W. A. Phillips for his significant contributions to the study of the mammals of Sri Lanka and South Asia.

== Discovery ==
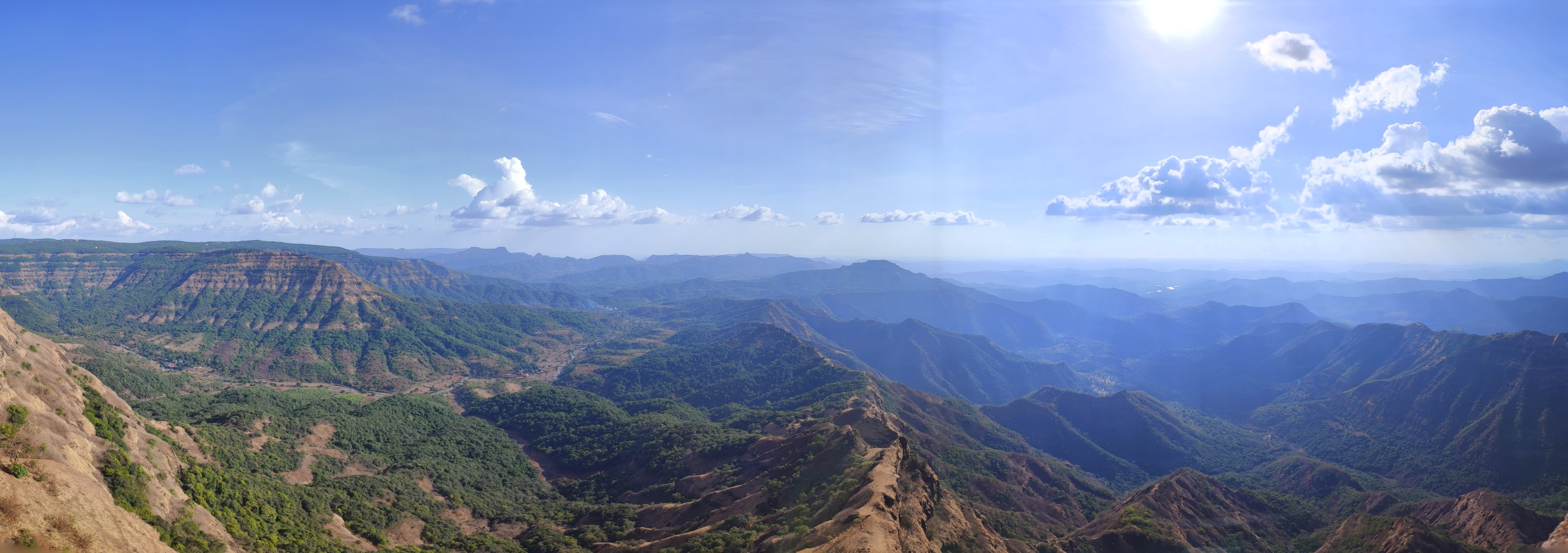
Landscape the Mahabaleshwar region, where t Miniopterus phillips was first discovered

It was formally described in 2022 by Tharaka Kusuminda, Amani Mannakkra, Kanishka D.B. Ukuwela, Sergei V. kruskop, Chamara J. Amarsinghe, Rajika Gamage, Parvathy Venugopal, Mathisha Karunarathna, Manuel Ruedi, Gabor Ksorba, Wipula B. Yapa and Bruce D. Patterson following an integrative taxonomic study combining morphological and DNA barcode analysis. The species was identified from the specimen collected in the evergreen forest of the Mahabaleshwar region in the Northern Western ghats of India. Comparison with the other members of the genus Miniopterus from India and Sri Lanka revealed consistent difference in external morphology, cranial characteristics and mitochondrial DNA sequences supporting its recognition as a distinct species. The species was named phillipsi in the honour of W.W.A. Phillips, in recognition of his significant contributions to the study of the mammals of the Sri Lanka and South Asia.

== Taxonomy ==
Miniopterus phillipsi belongs to the family Miniopteridae and the genus Miniopterus, a group of insectivorous bats. The species was discovered by Tharaka Kusuminda and colleagues following an integrative taxonomic study that combined morphological comparisons with mitochondrial DNA barcoding. The analysis demonstrated that populations from the northern Western ghats of India represented a distinct evolutionary lineage, clearly separable from the closely related M. fuliginosus and other Asian members of the genus.

== Description ==
Miniopterus phillips is a medium-sized bat of family Miniopteridae with a forearm length ranging from 44 to 49 mm. It exhibits characteristics features of genus Miniopterus including an elongated second phalanx of the third digit, short rounded ears, a high forehead, a short broad muzzle, and a slightly forward-curved tragus with a rounded tip. Its tail is approximately equal in length to the head and body combined. The fur is dense and soft, being chocolate-brown on the dorsal surface and slightly paler ventrally, with individual hairs showing little variation in colour. The skull is characterised by a broad rostrum and rounded brain case, while the detention conforms to the typical dental formula of the genus. Morphological analysis indicate that M. phillipsi is intermediate in size between the smaller M. pusillus and the larger M. magnater, and it differs from the closely related M. fuliginosus in several cranial, dental, and proportional measurements, providing the basis of its recorginition as a distinct species.
