= Least long-fingered bat =

Conservation status
- Data Deficient (IUCN 3.1)

Scientific classification
- Kingdom: Animalia
- Phylum: Chordata
- Class: Mammalia
- Order: Chiroptera
- Family: Miniopteridae
- Genus: Miniopterus
- Species: M. minor

Binomial name
- Miniopterus minor Peters, 1866

Species of bat

The least long-fingered bat (Miniopterus minor) is a species of vesper bat in the family Miniopteridae. It can be found in the Republic of the Congo, the Democratic Republic of the Congo, Kenya, São Tomé and Príncipe, and Tanzania.
