= Shortridge's long-fingered bat =

Conservation status
- Least Concern (IUCN 3.1)

Scientific classification
- Domain: Eukaryota
- Kingdom: Animalia
- Phylum: Chordata
- Class: Mammalia
- Order: Chiroptera
- Family: Miniopteridae
- Genus: Miniopterus
- Species: M. shortridgei

Binomial name
- Miniopterus shortridgei Laurie & Hill, 1957

Species of bat

Shortridge's long-fingered bat (Miniopterus shortridgei) is a bat in the genus Miniopterus which occurs throughout Indonesia. It was described by Eleanor Mary Ord Laurie and John Edwards Hill in 1957.
