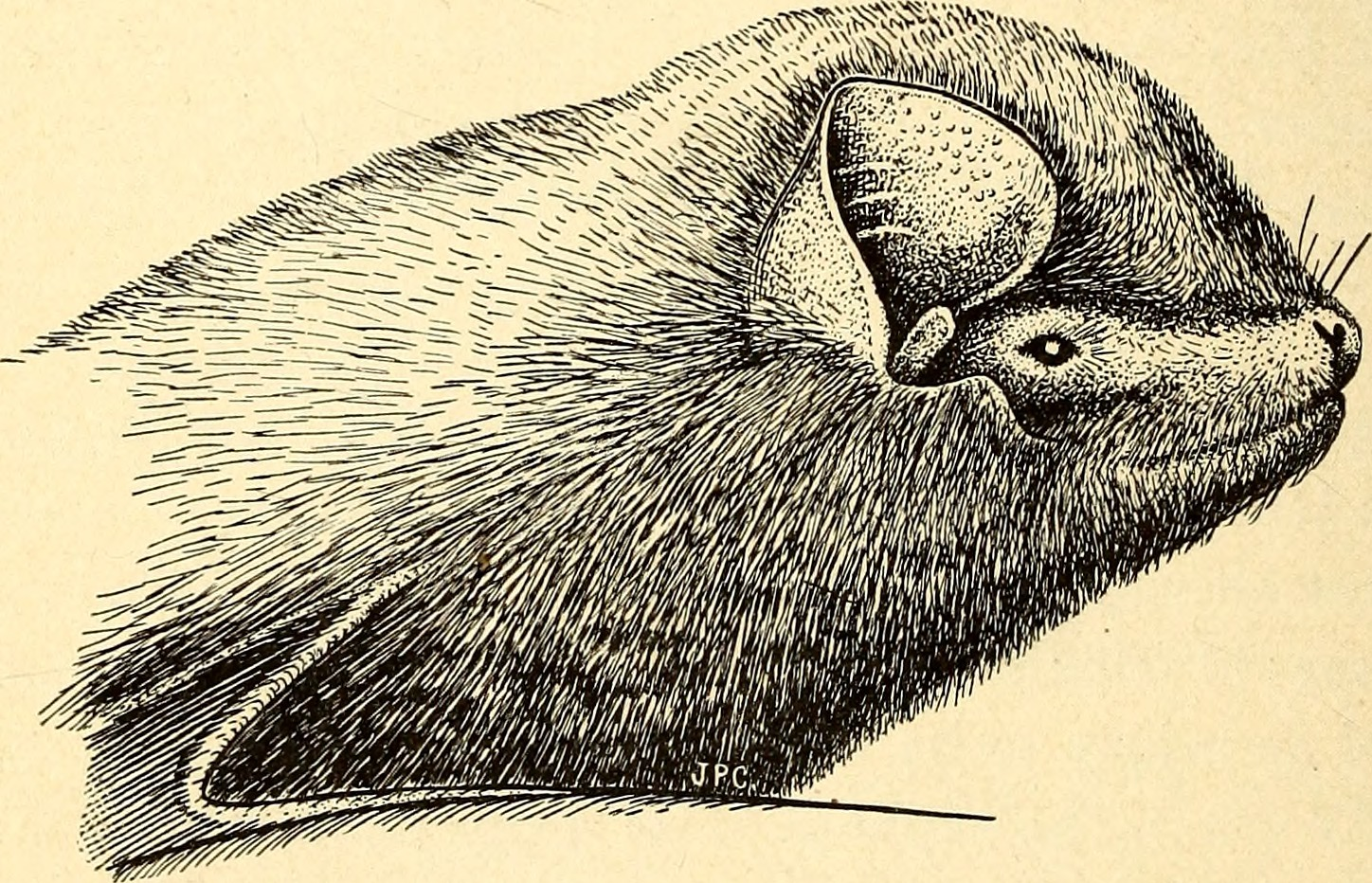

Conservation status
- Least Concern (IUCN 3.1)

Scientific classification
- Kingdom: Animalia
- Phylum: Chordata
- Class: Mammalia
- Order: Chiroptera
- Family: Miniopteridae
- Genus: Miniopterus
- Species: M. inflatus

Binomial name
- Miniopterus inflatus Thomas, 1903

= Greater long-fingered bat =

Species of bat

The greater long-fingered bat (Miniopterus inflatus) is a species in the family Miniopteridae. It is found in Cameroon, Central African Republic, Democratic Republic of the Congo, Equatorial Guinea, Ethiopia, Gabon, Guinea, Kenya, Liberia, Mozambique, Namibia, Rwanda, Tanzania, Uganda, and Zimbabwe. It roosts in caves. The long-fingered bats diet consists of trawling fish. This species is one of three bat species known to catch fish.

The greater long-fingered bat is a natural host to the blood parasite Polychromophilus melanipherus which is related to malaria-causing parasites.

The greater long-fingered bats possesses unique inner ear adaptation that improves its echolocation capability, especially in such complicated environments as caves and closed forest.
