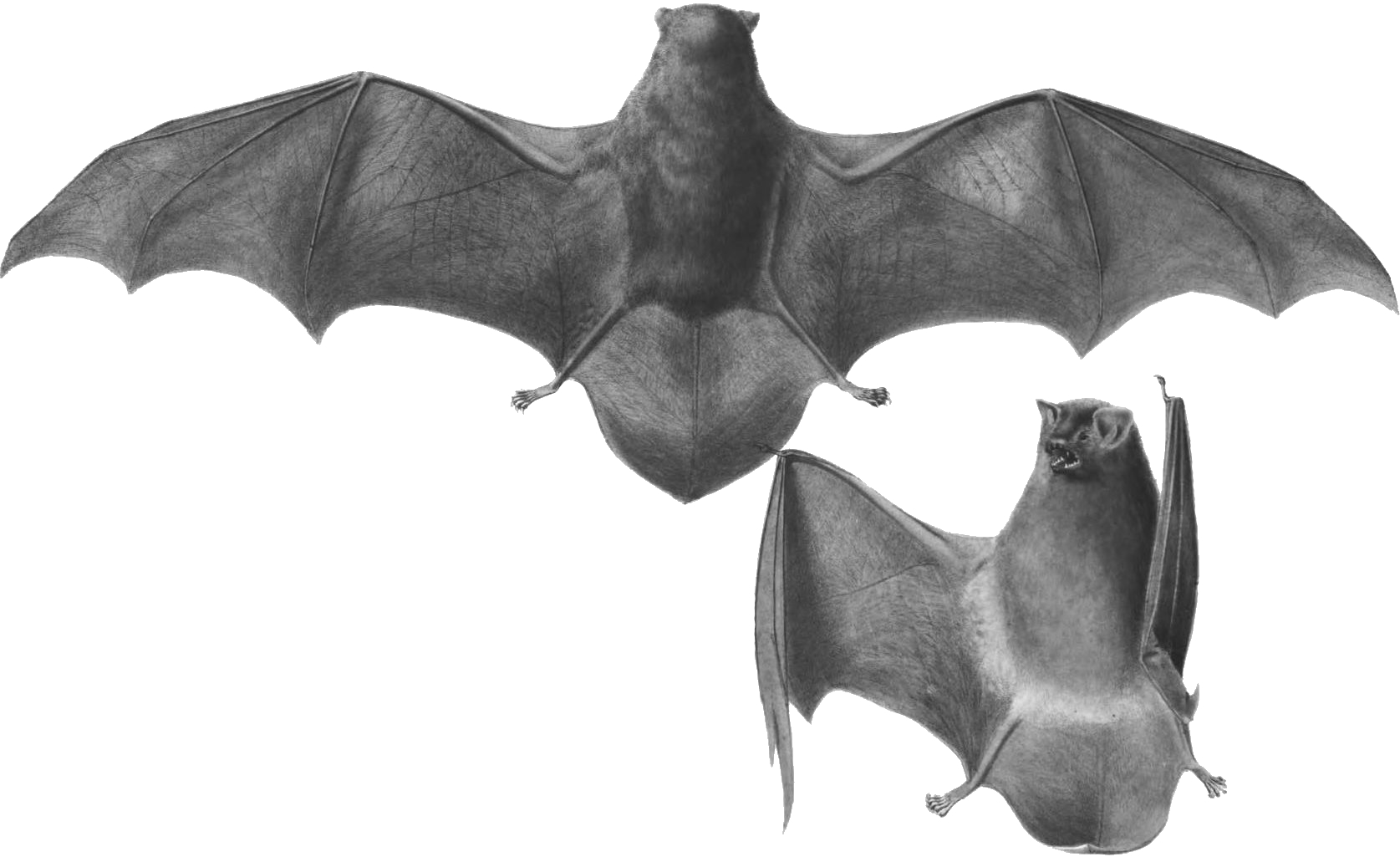
- Common bent-wing bat (Miniopterus schreibersi)

Scientific classification
- Kingdom: Animalia
- Phylum: Chordata
- Class: Mammalia
- Infraclass: Placentalia
- Order: Chiroptera
- Superfamily: Vespertilionoidea
- Family: Miniopteridae; Dobson, 1875
- Genus: Miniopterus; Bonaparte, 1837

Type species
- Vespertilio ursinii Bonaparte, 1837

Species
- See text
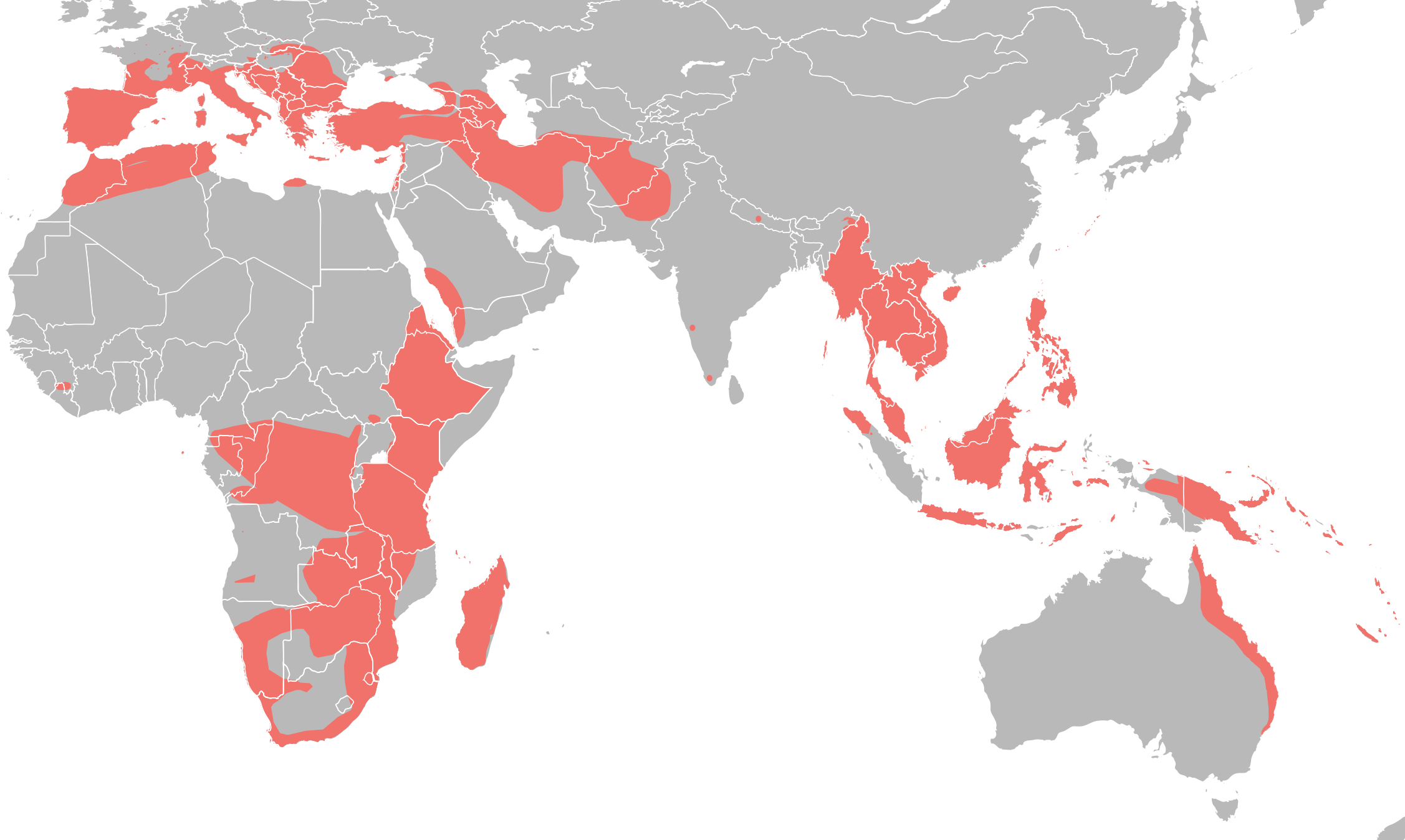
- Miniopterus distribution

= Miniopterus =

Miniopterus Temporal range: Miocene–Present (molecular data indicates Eocene origin, see article)

Genus of bats

Miniopterus, known as the bent-winged or long winged bats, is the sole genus of the family Miniopteridae. They are small flying insectivorous mammals, micro-bats of the order Chiroptera, with wings over twice the length of the body. The genus had been placed in its own subfamily among the vespertilionid bats, as Miniopterinae, but is now classified as its own family.

== Taxonomy ==
The genus was erected in 1837 by Charles L. Bonaparte. In the first systematic revision of the genus, published in a monograph of Miniopterus in 1858 by Robert F. Tomes, the author reallocated specimens and described new taxa. A new systematic arrangement was produced in an extensive study of poorly known chiropterans of the Indo-Austral region by James E. Hill in 1985, the greater resolution of the genus being determined by the British Museum of Natural History's acquisition of new series of specimens collected in Fiji, the New Hebrides and New Caledonia and the extensive collection made in New Guinea by ecologist Ben Gaskell on "Operation Drake".

Recognised as a very widely dispersed group with distinct morphology, biology and genetic characters, the number of species and systematic arrangements varied between still contradictory treatments. The genus was nested within Vespertilionidae as Miniopterinae, one of five subfamilies, with doubts remaining on the relationships to sister groups. The position of the minopterines was determined as showing a phylogenetic relationship to either the vespertilionids or the molossids, these assumptions were compared and analysed in study using large data sets derived from multiple genetic indicators and statistical analysis to determine the basal relationships within the order Chiroptera. The authors of this 2007 study found support for elevation to the rank of family—as Miniopteridae—and that the vespertilionids and Miniopterus species formed a clade that had diverged from the molossids (free-tailed bats) at a period around 54–43 million years ago and from other species 49–38 mya.

== Morphology ==
Bent-winged bats are typically small (total length c. 10 cm, wingspans 30–35 cm, mass less than 20 g), with broad, short muzzles. The cranium is bulbous and taller than the snout, a feature shared with woolly bats and mouse-eared bats. This combination of features was likely present in the common ancestor of the vesper bats. They have two tiny, vestigial premolars between the upper canines and first large premolar. Unlike other bats, they lack a tendon-locking mechanism in their toes.

The common name bent-winged bat refers to their most obvious feature, the group's ability to fold back an exceptionally long third finger when the wings are folded. This finger gives the bats long, narrow wings that allows them to move at high speed in open environments and in some species to migrate over a distance of hundreds of kilometres. The proportional length of the wing is around two and a half times that of the body and head.

== Research applications ==
In 2017, evidence of deltaretroviruses was found in the genome of the Miniopteridae. Deltaretroviruses only affect mammals, and this was the first evidence that they affected bat species. The presence of the deltaretrovirus in multiple Miniopterid species suggests that the virus was present in the family before speciation 20 million years ago. The evolutionary history of deltaretroviruses is important because they cause leukemia in humans.

== Classification ==
Family Miniopteridae

- Genus Miniopterus - long-winged bats
  - Aellen's long-fingered bat, Miniopterus aelleni
  - African long-fingered bat, Miniopterus africanus
  - Montagne d'Ambre long-fingered bat, Miniopterus ambohitrensis
  - †Miniopterus approximatus (fossil, Pliocene)
  - Sandy long-fingered bat, Miniopterus arenarius
  - Little bent-wing bat, Miniopterus australis
  - Javanese long-fingered bat, Miniopteris blepotis
  - Long-fingered bat, Miniopterus brachytragos (Madagascar long-fingered bat)
  - Eger's long-fingered bat, Miniopterus egeri
  - Eschscholtz's long-fingered bat, Miniopteris eschscholtzii
  - †Miniopterus fossilis (fossil, Miocene)
  - Lesser long-fingered bat, Miniopterus fraterculus
  - Eastern bent-wing bat, Miniopterus fuliginosus
  - Southeast Asian long-fingered bat, Miniopterus fuscus
  - Glen's long-fingered bat, Miniopterus gleni
  - Griffith's long-fingered bat, Miniopterus griffithsi
  - Comoro long-fingered bat, Miniopterus griveaudi
  - Greater long-fingered bat, Miniopterus inflatus
  - Small Melanesian long-fingered bat, Miniopterus macrocneme
  - Maghrebian bent-winged bat, Miniopterus maghrebensis
  - Western bent-winged bat, Miniopterus magnater
  - Mahafaly long-fingered bat, Miniopterus mahafaliensis
  - Major's long-fingered bat, Miniopterus majori
  - Manavi long-fingered bat, Miniopterus manavi
  - Intermediate long-fingered bat, Miniopterus medius
  - Least long-fingered bat, Miniopterus minor
  - Mozambique long-fingered bat, Miniopterus mossambicus
  - Natal long-fingered bat, Miniopterus natalensis
  - Newton's long-fingered bat, Miniopterus newtoni
  - Nimba long-fingered bat, Miniopterus nimbae
  - Australasian bent-wing bat, Miniopterus orianae
  - Pale bent-winged bat, Miniopterus pallidus
  - Philippine long-fingered bat, Miniopterus paululus
  - Peterson's long-fingered bat Miniopterus petersoni
  - Phillips's long-fingered bat, Miniopterus phillipsi
  - Small bent-winged bat, Miniopterus pusillus
  - Loyalty bent-winged bat, Miniopterus robustior
  - Miniopterus rummeli (fossil, Miocene)
  - Common bent-wing bat, Miniopterus schreibersii
  - Shortridge's long-fingered bat Miniopterus shortridgei
  - Sororcula long-fingered bat, Miniopterus sororculus
  - †Miniopterus tao (fossil, Pleistocene)
  - Great bent-winged bat, Miniopterus tristis
  - Villiers's bent-winged bat, Miniopterus villiersi
  - Wilson's long-fingered bat, Miniopterus wilsoni
  - †Miniopterus zapfei (fossil, Miocene)

The fossil genus Tachypteron Storch et al. 2002 is known from the Messel Formation of Germany. It was previously recovered as a member of the Emballonuridae, but a 2024 study unexpectedly recovered it as a member of Miniopteridae, although this classification is tentative.

== Range ==
Bent-winged bats occur in southern Europe, across Africa and Madagascar, throughout Asia, and in Australia, Vanuatu and New Caledonia. One species, the common bent-wing bat, inhabits the whole of this range. The group rapidly colonized much of this area in the last 15,000 years.

== See also ==
- List of bats of Madagascar
