= Glen's long-fingered bat =

Conservation status
- Least Concern (IUCN 3.1)

Scientific classification
- Kingdom: Animalia
- Phylum: Chordata
- Class: Mammalia
- Infraclass: Placentalia
- Order: Chiroptera
- Family: Miniopteridae
- Genus: Miniopterus
- Species: M. gleni

Binomial name
- Miniopterus gleni Peterson, Egar & Mitchell, 1995
- Glen's long-fingered bat range

Species of bat

Glen's long-fingered bat (Miniopterus gleni) is a species of vesper bat in the family Miniopteridae found only in Madagascar.

== Discovery ==
Miniopterus gleni was formally described as a new species by R. L. Peterson, J. L. Eger and L. Mitchell in 1995 in Faune de Madagascar, volume 84, Chiroptères. The species was based on a holotype (ROM:MAM:42567) collected from a marine cave between Sarodrano and Saint-Augustin, about 20 km south of Toliara (Tuléar), Madagascar. The holotype was collected on 9 May 1967 and consists of a skin and skull. The species was originally described under the name Miniopterus gleni, which remains its currently accepted scientific name.
