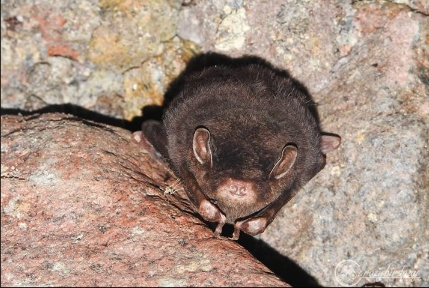

Conservation status
- Least Concern (IUCN 3.1)

Scientific classification
- Kingdom: Animalia
- Phylum: Chordata
- Class: Mammalia
- Infraclass: Placentalia
- Order: Chiroptera
- Family: Miniopteridae
- Genus: Miniopterus
- Species: M. pusillus

Binomial name
- Miniopterus pusillus Dobson, 1876
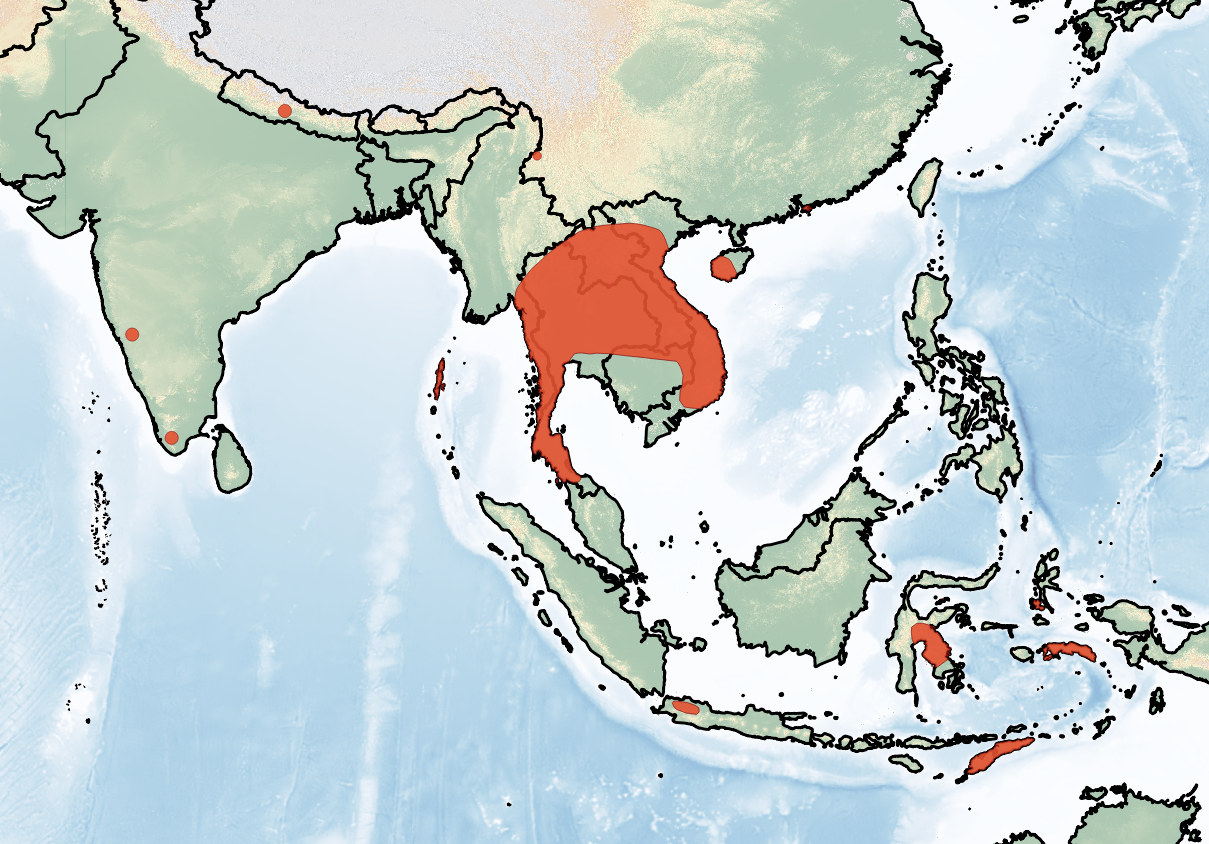

= Small bent-winged bat =

Small Bent-Winged Bat

Species of bat

The small bent-winged bat (Miniopterus pusillus) is a species in the bat family Miniopteridae, which has similarities and distinctive differences from the family of vesper bats. A novel version of coronavirus has been identified in this species. It can be found in Bangladesh, Bhutan, India, Indonesia, Laos, Malaysia, Nepal, Philippines, Thailand and Vietnam.

== Taxonomy ==
Miniopterus pusillus is a species of bat in the genus Miniopterus and family Miniopteridae. It was described by George Edward Dobson in 1876. The Mammal Diversity Database currently recognises M. pusillus as a valid living species and lists Small Long-fingered Bat as its primary common name, with Small Bent-winged Bat and Nicobar Bent-winged Bat among its other common names.

Its current classification places it in the order Chiroptera, suborder Yangochiroptera, superfamily Vespertilionoidea, family Miniopteridae, and genus Miniopterus. The species was historically associated with the family Vespertilionidae, but Miniopterus is currently placed in the separate family Miniopteridae.
