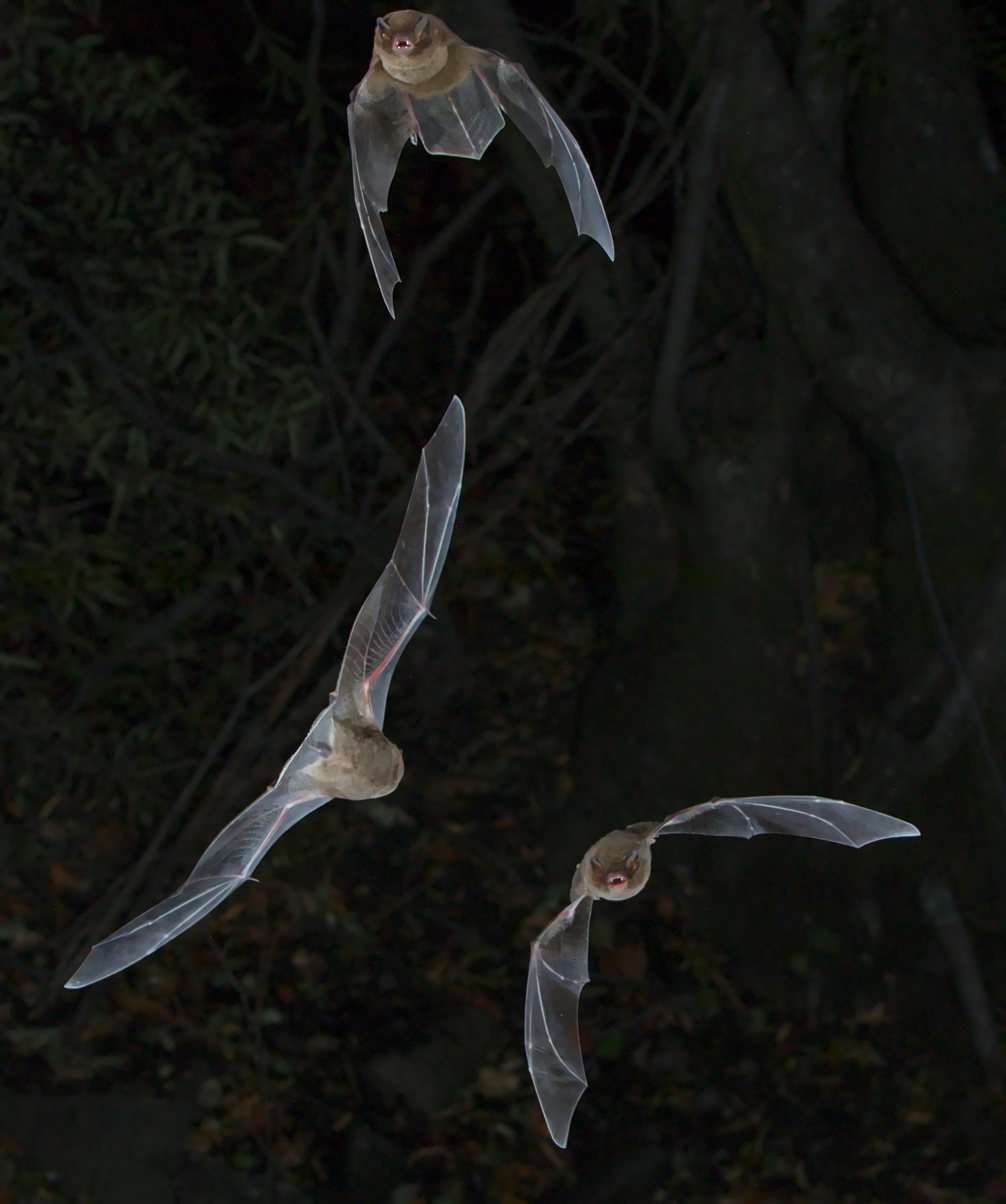

Conservation status
- Least Concern (IUCN 3.1)

Scientific classification
- Kingdom: Animalia
- Phylum: Chordata
- Class: Mammalia
- Order: Chiroptera
- Family: Miniopteridae
- Genus: Miniopterus
- Species: M. natalensis

Binomial name
- Miniopterus natalensis A. Smith, 1834
- Natal long-fingered bat distribution Extant (resident) Possibly extant (resident)

= Natal long-fingered bat =

Species of bat

The Natal long-fingered bat (Miniopterus natalensis) is a species of vesper bat in the family Miniopteridae. It can be found in Angola, Botswana, Democratic Republic of the Congo, possibly Eswatini, Ethiopia, Kenya, Lesotho, Malawi, Mozambique, Namibia, South Africa, South Sudan, Tanzania, Uganda, Zambia, and Zimbabwe. It is found in dry savanna, moist savanna, Mediterranean-type shrubby vegetation, caves, and hot deserts.

The Natal long-fingered bat relies on photoperiod, which is the length of daylight as a cue for migration. When the night shortens, bat activity increases.

While Natal long-fingered bats normally prey on insects, they can sometimes prey on fish. For this, the long-fingered bats have been able to use their primary ability to react to a disappearing target in order to catch moving fish by reaching deeper in the water when a fish dives.

== Gallery ==
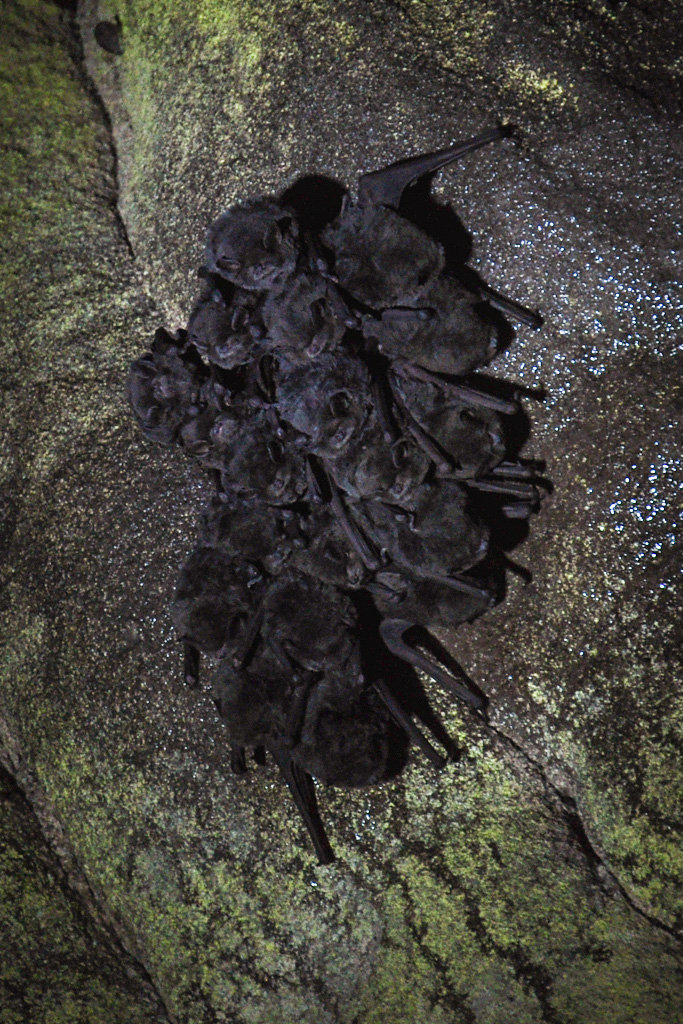

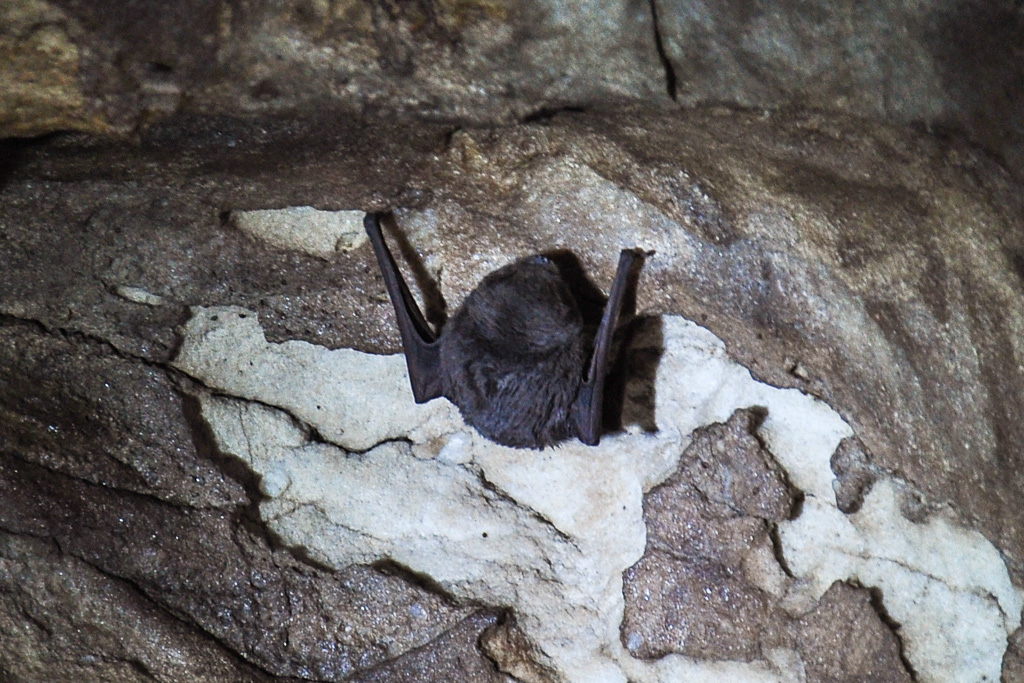
