= Steven M. Goodman =

American conservation biologist

Steven Goodman
- Born: August 3, 1957 (age 69)
- Citizenship: United States of America
- Education: Interlochen Arts Academy High School; University of Michigan; University of Hamburg; Paris-Sud 11 University
- Known for: Ecological Training Program
- Spouse: Gandie Asmina
- Children: Hesham Tafara Goodman
- Awards: MacArthur Fellows Program
- Scientific career
- Fields: Biology

Steven Michael Goodman (born August 3, 1957) is an American conservation biologist, and field biologist on staff in the Department of Zoology at the Field Museum of Natural History in Chicago.

== Life ==
He graduated from the Interlochen Arts Academy High School in 1975. He graduated from the University of Michigan with a B.S. in 1984, from the University of Hamburg with a Ph.D. in 2000, and from the Université Paris-Sud XI, with an H.D.R. in 2005. In the early 1990s, with the World Wildlife Fund, he created the Ecological Training Program (ETP).

== Awards ==
- 2005 MacArthur Fellows Program
- Biodiversity Award

== Works ==
- Extinct Madagascar: Picturing the Island's Past. Steven M. Goodman, William L. Jungers, University of Chicago Press, 2014, ISBN 978-0-226-14397-2
- The Natural History of Madagascar. Editors Steven M. Goodman, Jonathan P. Benstead, University of Chicago Press, 2003, ISBN 978-0-226-30306-2
- The Birds of Egypt. Edited by Steven M. Goodman & Peter L. Meininger, Oxford University Press, 1989, ISBN 0-19-857644-7
