= Miniopterus griveaudi =

Conservation status
- Data Deficient (IUCN 3.1)

Scientific classification
- Kingdom: Animalia
- Phylum: Chordata
- Class: Mammalia
- Infraclass: Placentalia
- Order: Chiroptera
- Family: Miniopteridae
- Genus: Miniopterus
- Species: M. griveaudi

Binomial name
- Miniopterus griveaudi Harrison, 1959
- Collection localities of Miniopterus griveaudi

Synonyms
- Miniopterus minor griveaudi Harrison, 1959; Miniopterus manavi griveaudi: Peterson et al., 1995; Miniopterus griveaudi: Juste et al., 2007

Bat in the family Miniopteridae from the Comoros and Madagascar

Miniopterus griveaudi is a bat in the genus Miniopterus found on Grande Comore and Anjouan in the Comoros and in northern and western Madagascar. First described in 1959 from Grande Comore as a subspecies of the mainland African M. minor, it was later placed with the Malagasy M. manavi. However, morphological and molecular studies published in 2008 and 2009 indicated that M. manavi as then defined contained five distinct, unrelated species, and M. griveaudi was redefined as a species occurring on both Madagascar and the Comoros.

With a forearm length of 35 to 38 mm (1.4 to 1.5 in), M. griveaudi is a small Miniopterus. It is usually dark brown, but sometimes reddish. The tragus (a projection inside the ear) is narrow and ends in a rounded tip. The uropatagium (tail membrane) appears virtually naked. In the skull, the palate is concave and the rostrum (front part) is rounded. The species occurs up to 480 m (1,570 ft) above sea level on Madagascar, often in karstic areas. In the Comoros, it reaches 890 m (2,920 ft) and roosts in lava tubes as well as shallower caves. Females collected on Grande Comore in November were pregnant, but data on reproduction is limited and suggests individual and inter-island variation.

== Taxonomy ==
In 1959, David Harrison described a small Miniopterus from the island of Grande Comore as a subspecies, Miniopterus minor griveaudi, of the mainland African species M. minor. The name griveaudi honors Paul Griveaud, who collected the specimens on which Harrison based his description. This classification remained for the next few decades; in 1992, for example, Javier Juste and Carlos Ibáñez recognized five subspecies, including griveaudi, within M. minor, ranging from São Tomé to Madagascar. In their 1995 review of Madagascar bats, Randolph Peterson and colleagues recognized the small Malagasy Miniopterus as a separate species, Miniopterus manavi, with griveaudi as a subspecies.

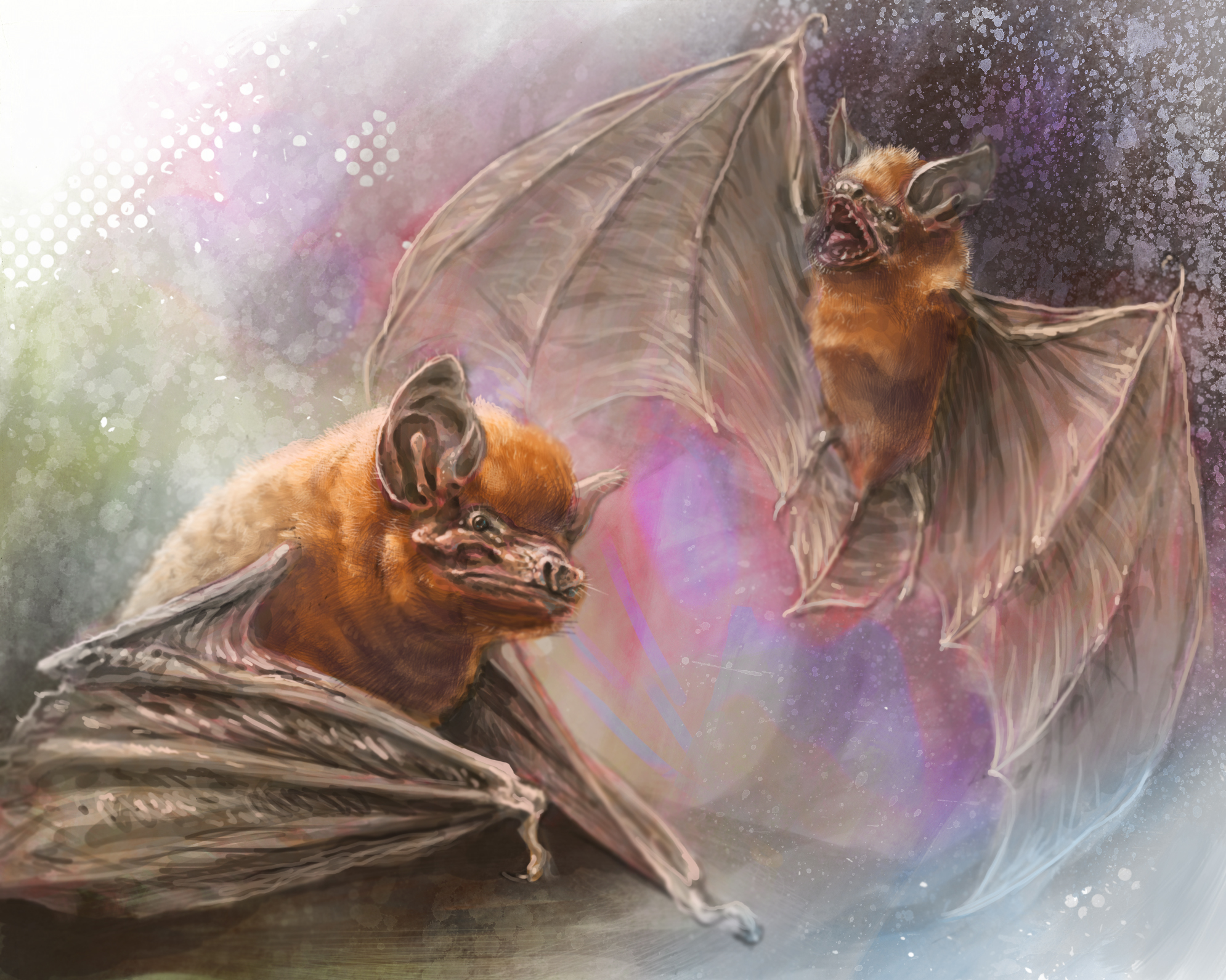
Illustration of Miniopterus manavi

In 2007, Juste and colleagues re-examined the relationships of the M. minor group using DNA sequences from the mitochondrial cytochrome b (cyt b) gene. They found that griveaudi from Grande Comoro, manavi from Madagascar, and M. minor newtoni (currently Miniopterus newtoni) from São Tomé were not closely related; however, the representatives of "manavi" used in their study were misidentified specimens of M. majori.

In another molecular study, published in 2008 and using both cyt b and mitochondrial D-loop sequences, Nicole Weyeneth and colleagues found that examined specimens of "Miniopterus manavi" actually grouped in two, distantly related clades—one including specimens from Madagascar, Anjouan, and Grande Comore, and the other occurring on Madagascar and Anjouan only.

The next year, Steven Goodman and colleagues further explored the relationships of the bats known as "Miniopterus manavi" using cyt b sequences and morphological comparisons. They found five species within "M. manavi", which are not each other's closest relatives, forming an example of convergent evolution. Up to four species of the group may occur in a single locality. Miniopterus griveaudi, now recognized as a full species, was found to occur on Grande Comore, Anjouan, and northern and western Madagascar, and M. manavi was restricted to the eastern margin of Madagascar's Central Highlands. Three other species were newly described: Miniopterus aelleni on Anjouan and in northern and western Madagascar; Miniopterus brachytragos in northern and western Madagascar only; and Miniopterus mahafaliensis in southwestern Madagascar. Cyt b sequences suggest that M. griveaudi occupies an isolated position among African and Malagasy Miniopterus.

== Description ==
Miniopterus griveaudi is a small, dark brown Miniopterus species. M. aelleni is similar in color, but M. manavi is darker and M. brachytragos and M. mahafaliensis are lighter. The upperparts are occasionally reddish brown; this color variant occurs more often in the Comoro populations than on Madagascar. In the Comoros, individual colonies or groups sometimes consist exclusively of one color variant, but there is no apparent genetic differentiation between the two forms. The head is usually somewhat lighter than the body and the hairs of the underparts have buffish tips. The tragus (a projection on the inner side of the outer ear) is straight and narrow and ends in a rounded tip. Other species have differently shaped tragi. The wing membrane is also brown, but the uropatagium (tail membrane) is lighter. The wing membrane and uropatagium are attached to the upper leg at the same level, near the ankle. The uropatagium is sparsely covered with thin hairs that are virtually invisible to the naked eye. In contrast, M. manavi, M. mahafaliensis, and M. brachytragos have densely covered uropatagia and that of M. aelleni is sparsely, but visibly haired. There are some differences in measurements among the island populations; animals from Grande Comore are generally smallest, those from Anjouan are intermediate, and those from Madagascar are largest.

Measurements
Island	n	Total length	Tail	Hindfoot	Tragus	Ear	Forearm	Mass
Anjouan	38	87.8 (85–91)	41.0 (38–44)	5.0 (4–6)	5.2 (5–6)	10.1 (9–11)	36.8 (35–38)	4.8 (3.8–5.8)
Grande Comore	34–37	83.6 (80–89)	39.4 (35–42)	4.9 (4–5)	5.8 (5–6)	10.3 (10–11)	36.3 (35–38)	4.4 (3.6–5.8)
Madagascar	18	89.3 (86–93)	40.1 (35–43)	5.8 (5–7)	5.9 (5–7)	10.4 (9–11)	36.9 (35–38)	5.4 (4.1–7.1)
All measurements are in the form "mean (minimum–maximum)" and are in millimeters, except mass in grams.

The animal has a karyotype of 46 chromosomes, with a total of 50 major arms on the autosomes (non-sex chromosomes). The X chromosome is submetacentric (with one arm slightly longer than the other) and the Y chromosome is small and acrocentric (with one very short and one long arm). The karyotype is conserved among species of Miniopterus; the number of chromosomes and arms is identical in M. griveaudi, the Malagasy M. aelleni and M. gleni, and even the Asian M. fuliginosus.

In the skull, the rostrum (front part) is rounded. The central groove in the nasal depression (the lowered area at the nose) is relatively broad in comparison to M. manavi. The frontal bones (part of the skull roof) bear a well-developed sagittal crest (a crest that provides support for muscles of the head). Further back on the braincase, the lambdoid crest (another such crest) is also prominent. The middle part of the palate is concave, as in M. brachytragos and M. mahafaliensis, but unlike in M. aelleni and M. manavi, which have a flat palate. At the palate's back margin is a long, robust posterior palatal spine.

== Distribution and ecology ==
On Madagascar, the distribution of M. griveaudi extends along the western lowlands north to Ankarana in the far north of the island, and on eastern Madagascar south to the vicinity of Daraina. It is found up to 480 m (1,570 ft) above sea level and often occurs in karstic areas. Its range extensively overlaps that of M. aelleni, which is regularly found in the same forests and caves. Although some ecological and behavioral data has been published on "Miniopterus manavi", the recognition of several cryptic species within this group, which may occur in the same places, renders the association of these data with any of the species now recognized uncertain; however, species of Miniopterus generally feed on insects. Miniopterus griveaudi was assessed as "Data Deficient" on the IUCN Red List in 2008, but the account predates the recognition of the species on Anjouan and Madagascar.

Miniopterus griveaudi is known from 15 to 670 m (50 to 2,200 ft) altitude on Grande Comore and 5 to 890 m (20 to 2,920 ft) on Anjouan. In the Comoros, it roosts in caves, both lava tubes and shallower structures; it was found to share one cave on Grande Comore with another bat, Rousettus obliviosus. Individuals of M. griveaudi have been found to leave a Grande Comore cave at sunset. Flying M. griveaudi have mostly been recorded in forests, but this may reflect a lack of survey effort in open areas. In caves, individuals either group in large groups of more than 50 bats without reproductive activity or in smaller groups of at most five reproductively active bats. Limited data on reproduction show some notable variation between individuals and islands. In two caves surveyed on Grande Comore in November 2006, all females were pregnant with single embryos with crown-rump lengths of 14 to 19 mm (0.55 to 0.75 in), but none of the males were reproductively active. In another cave, none of the bats examined at the same time—all males—were reproductively active. None of the bats captured in one of the caves in April 2007 showed signs of reproductive activity. On Anjouan, no bats were reproductively active in two caves surveyed in late November 2006.

Although specimens of M. griveaudi differ by only 0.6% in their cyt b sequences, analysis of D-loop data does show some differentiation between the island populations. These data suggest that the species originated on Madagascar, where a large, stable population persists, and independently colonized Grande Comore and Anjouan; subsequently, the Grande Comore and Anjouan populations came into contact, resulting in inter-island gene flow.

== Literature cited ==
- Goodman, S.M., Maminirina, C.P., Weyeneth, N., Bradman, H.M., Christidis, L., Ruedi, M. and Appleton, B. 2009a. The use of molecular and morphological characters to resolve the taxonomic identity of cryptic species: the case of Miniopterus manavi (Chiroptera: Miniopteridae) (subscription required). Zoologica Scripta 38:339–363.
- Goodman, S.M., Maminirina, C.P., Bradman, H.M., Christidis, L. and Appleton, B. 2009b. The use of molecular phylogenetic and morphological tools to identify cryptic and paraphyletic species: Examples from the diminutive long-fingered bats (Chiroptera: Miniopteridae: Miniopterus) on Madagascar. American Museum Novitates 3669:1–34.
- Goodman, S.M., Weyeneth, N., Ibrahim, Y., Saïd, I. and Ruedi, M. 2010. A review of the bat fauna of the Comoro Archipelago (subscription required). Acta Chiropterologica 12(1):117–141.
- Harrison, D.L. 1959. A new subspecies of lesser long-winged bat Miniopterus minor Peters, 1867, from the Comoro Islands. Durban Museum Novitates 5:191–196.
- Juste, J. and Ibáñez, C. 1992. Taxonomic review of Miniopterus minor Peters, 1867 (Mammalia: Chiroptera) from western central Africa. Bonner Zoologische Beiträge 43:355–365.
- Juste, J., Ferrández, A., Fa, J.E., Masefield, W. and Ibáñez, C. 2007. Taxonomy of little bentwinged bats (Miniopterus, Miniopteridae) from the African islands of São Tomé, Grand Comoro and Madagascar, based on mtDNA (subscription required). Acta Chiropterologica 9:27–37.
- Nowak, R.M. 1994. Walker's Bats of the World. Baltimore: The Johns Hopkins University Press, 287 pp. ISBN 978-0-8018-4986-2
- Peterson, R.L., Eger, J.L. and Mitchell, L. 1995. Chiroptères. Faune de Madagascar 84:1–204 (in French).
- Richards, L.R., Rambau, R.V., Lamb, J.M., Taylor, P.J., Yang, F., Schoeman, M.C. and Goodman, S.M. 2010. Cross-species chromosome painting in bats from Madagascar: the contribution of Myzopodidae to revealing ancestral syntenies in Chiroptera (subscription required). Chromosome Research 18:635–653.
- Weyeneth, N., Goodman, S.M., Stanley, W.T. and Ruedi, M. 2008. The biogeography of Miniopterus bats (Chiroptera: Miniopteridae) from the Comoro Archipelago inferred from mitochondrial DNA (subscription required). Molecular Ecology 17:5205–5219.
