= Miniopterus aelleni =

Conservation status
- Least Concern (IUCN 3.1)

Scientific classification
- Kingdom: Animalia
- Phylum: Chordata
- Class: Mammalia
- Infraclass: Placentalia
- Order: Chiroptera
- Family: Miniopteridae
- Genus: Miniopterus
- Species: M. aelleni

Binomial name
- Miniopterus aelleni Goodman et al., 2009
- Collection localities of Miniopterus aelleni (in green)

Bat in the family Miniopteridae from the Comoros and Madagascar

Miniopterus aelleni is a bat in the genus Miniopterus that occurs on Anjouan in the Comoros and in northern and western Madagascar.

It is a small brown bat; its forearm length is 35 to 41 mm (1.4 to 1.6 in). The long tragus (a projection in the outer ear) has a broad base and a blunt or rounded tip. The uropatagium (tail membrane) is sparsely haired. The palate is flat, and there are distinct diastemata (gaps) between the upper canines and premolars.

Populations of this species have historically been included in Miniopterus manavi, but evidence published in 2008 and 2009 indicates that M. manavi is a complex of five separate species, including the newly described M. aelleni. M. aelleni has been found in forests and caves in karstic areas. Its distribution overlaps that of M. griveaudi, also formerly included in M. manavi.

== Taxonomy ==
In a 1995 contribution to Faune de Madagascar on Malagasy bats, Randolph Peterson and colleagues listed four species of Miniopterus on Madagascar and the nearby Comoros, including the small Miniopterus manavi with a broad distribution on both Madagascar and the Comoros. However, during the first decade of the 21st century, molecular studies have revealed that Miniopterus, a widespread genus in the Old World, is much more species-rich than previously thought. A 2008 study comparing sequences of the mitochondrial cytochrome b and D-loop markers found two distinct, unrelated groups within the supposed M. manavi from the Comoros; both groups were also found on Madagascar. The next year, Steven Goodman and colleagues revisited the group with more extensive sampling on Madagascar. They separated three species within the former "M. manavi": M. manavi itself in the Central Highlands, M. griveaudi (previously a subspecies of M. manavi) on Anjouan, Grande Comore, and northern and western Madagascar, and the newly described Miniopterus aelleni on Anjouan and northern and western Madagascar. The specific name aelleni honors Prof. Villy Aellen of the Natural History Museum of Geneva, who has done much research on African bats. Within M. aelleni, Goodman and colleagues found some differentiation (3.4% sequence divergence in cytochrome b sequences) between individuals from Montagne d'Ambre in northern Madagascar and those from Anjouan and Ankarana, near Montagne d'Ambre; the cytochrome b divergence between M. aelleni and other Malagasy Miniopterus is 7 to 10%.

Later in 2009, Goodman and colleagues described two more species of M. manavi-like Malagasy Miniopterus: M. brachytragos from northern Madagascar and M. mahafaliensis from the southwest. On the basis of cytochrome b sequences, they found that M. aelleni was most closely related to a clade of M. brachytragos, M. manavi, and another recently described Malagasy species, M. petersoni. The five recognized species of M. manavi-like bats are not each other's closest relatives, but apparently acquired their similarities through convergent evolution. At some places (for example, Namoroka) four cryptic species of M. manavi-like bats, including M. aelleni, occur together.

== Description ==
Measurements
Island	n	Total length	Tail	Hindfoot	Tragus	Ear	Forearm	Mass
Anjouan	5	89.8 (88–91)	43.4 (41–46)	5.2 (5–6)	6.0 (6–6)	10.6 (10–11)	38.2 (37–39)	5.6 (4.7–6.5)
Madagascar	12	90.7 (88–95)	42.1 (40–45)	6.1 (5–7)	6.1 (5–8)	11.1 (10–12)	38.8 (35–41)	4.6 (3.9–6.5)
All measurements are in the form "mean (minimum–maximum)" and are in millimeters, except mass in grams.

Miniopterus aelleni is a small, brown Miniopterus species. The head may be slightly lighter in color than the body. Some hairs on the underparts have buff tips. Miniopterus griveaudi is similar in color, but M. manavi is darker and M. brachytragos and M. mahafaliensis are lighter. The tragus (a projection on the inner side of the outer ear) is long and has a broad base with a crest at the side, and ends in a blunt to slightly rounded tip. In M. manavi and M. griveaudi, in contrast, the base is narrower, in M. mahafaliensis, the sides of the tragus are parallel, and M. brachytragus has a short, blunt tragus sparsely covered with hair. The wing membrane is also brown, but the uropatagium is lighter. The wing membrane and uropatagium are attached to the upper leg at the same level, above the ankle. The uropatagium is sparsely covered with thin, but clearly visible hairs. In contrast, M. manavi, M. mahafaliensis, and M. brachytragos have densely covered uropatagia and that of M. griveaudi is almost naked. Individuals from Anjouan have significantly shorter hindfeet than those from Madagascar, but otherwise the two populations cannot be distinguished on the basis of external characteristics.

In the skull, the rostrum (front part) is short and line-shaped, but longer than in other manavi-like species. The central groove in the nasal depression is relatively narrow. The frontal bones are rounded and bear a well-developed sagittal crest. Further back on the braincase, the lambdoid crest is also prominent. The middle part of the palate is flat, as in M. manavi but unlike in M. brachytragos, M. griveaudi, and M. mahafaliensis, which have a curved palate. At the palate's back margin is a long, thin posterior palatal spine. Miniopterus aelleni has 36 teeth in the dental formula 2.1.2.33.1.3.3 (two incisors, one canine, two premolars, and three molars in both upper toothrows and three incisors, one canine, three premolars, and three molars in the lower toothrows). As is characteristic of Miniopterus, the first upper premolar (P2; P1 and P3 are missing) is smaller and more simplified than the second (P4). There are clear diastemata (gaps) between the upper canine (C1) and P2 and between P2 and P4, which are weaker or absent in M. griveaudi and M. manavi. Behind C1, the toothrows are about parallel, not divergent as in M. manavi. The third upper molar (M3) is more compressed than in M. manavi and M. griveaudi. In some measurements of the skull and teeth, Anjouan specimens are larger than those from Madagascar.

The animal has a karyotype of 46 chromosomes, with a total of 50 major arms on the autosomes (non-sex chromosomes). The karyotype is conserved among species of Miniopterus; the number of chromosomes and arms is identical in M. aelleni, the Malagasy M. griveaudi and M. gleni, and even the Asian M. fuliginosus.

== Distribution and ecology ==
Miniopterus aelleni is known to live from 4 to 225 m (13 to 738 ft) above sea level in northern and western Madagascar, at 1,100 m (3,600 ft) on Montagne d'Ambre, northern Madagascar, and from 220 to 690 m (720 to 2,260 ft) on Anjouan in the nearby Comoros. On Madagascar, it has been recorded in forest and caves in karst areas; its distribution broadly overlaps that of M. griveaudi and the two have been found in the same roost sites on several occasions. On Anjouan, M. aelleni is less common than M. griveaudi; there, it is known from four specimens only, all collected in 2006. These come from two nearby sites: a rocky area near a river and a disturbed forest. These animals, collected in late November, were in reproductive condition, with two females pregnant and a third lactating. M. griveaudi were reproductively active at the same time, suggesting that the reproductive seasons of the two do not differ significantly. Although some ecological and behavioral data has been published on Miniopterus manavi, the recognition of several cryptic species within this group, more than one of which may occur in any given locality, renders the association of these data with any of the individual species uncertain; however, species of Miniopterus generally feed on insects. Because M. aelleni is widespread and occurs in many protected areas on Madagascar, Goodman and colleagues inferred that its conservation status is secure.

== Literature cited ==
- Goodman, S.M., Maminirina, C.P., Weyeneth, N., Bradman, H.M., Christidis, L., Ruedi, M. and Appleton, B. 2009a. The use of molecular and morphological characters to resolve the taxonomic identity of cryptic species: the case of Miniopterus manavi (Chiroptera: Miniopteridae) (subscription required). Zoologica Scripta 38:339–363.
- Goodman, S.M., Maminirina, C.P., Bradman, H.M., Christidis, L. and Appleton, B. 2009b. The use of molecular phylogenetic and morphological tools to identify cryptic and paraphyletic species: Examples from the diminutive long-fingered bats (Chiroptera: Miniopteridae: Miniopterus) on Madagascar. American Museum Novitates 3669:1–34.
- Goodman, S.M., Weyeneth, N., Ibrahim, Y., Saïd, I. and Ruedi, M. 2010. A review of the bat fauna of the Comoro Archipelago (subscription required). Acta Chiropterologica 12(1):117–141.
- Nowak, R.M. 1994. Walker's Bats of the World. Baltimore: The Johns Hopkins University Press, 287 pp. ISBN 978-0-8018-4986-2
- Peterson, R.L., Eger, J.L. and Mitchell, L. 1995. Chiroptères. Faune de Madagascar 84:1–204 (in French).
- Richards, L.R., Rambau, R.V., Lamb, J.M., Taylor, P.J., Yang, F., Schoeman, M.C. and Goodman, S.M. 2010. Cross-species chromosome painting in bats from Madagascar: the contribution of Myzopodidae to revealing ancestral syntenies in Chiroptera (subscription required). Chromosome Research 18:635–653.
- Weyeneth, N., Goodman, S.M., Stanley, W.T. and Ruedi, M. 2008. The biogeography of Miniopterus bats (Chiroptera: Miniopteridae) from the Comoro Archipelago inferred from mitochondrial DNA (subscription required). Molecular Ecology 17:5205–5219.
