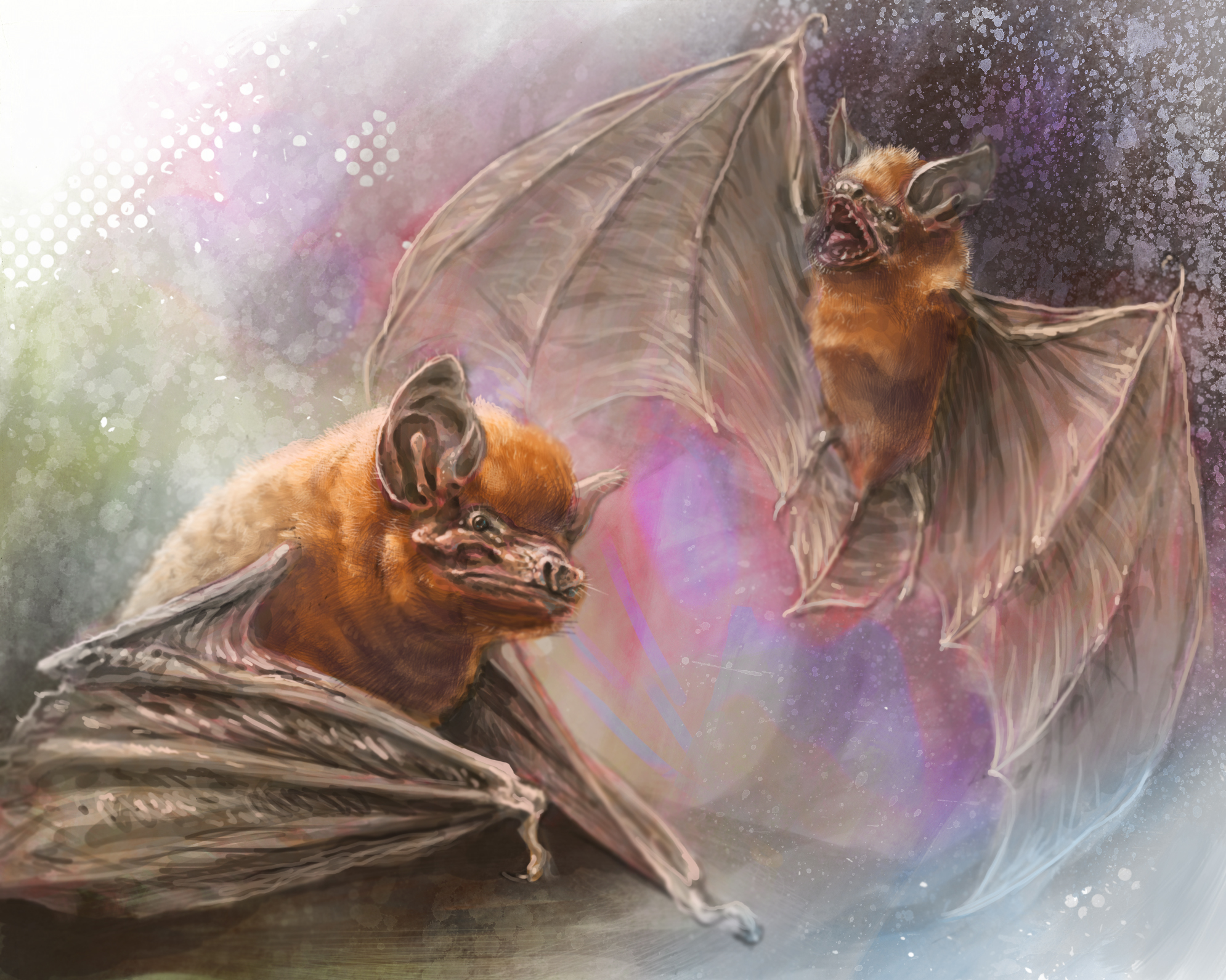

Conservation status
- Least Concern (IUCN 3.1)

Scientific classification
- Kingdom: Animalia
- Phylum: Chordata
- Class: Mammalia
- Order: Chiroptera
- Family: Miniopteridae
- Genus: Miniopterus
- Species: M. manavi

Binomial name
- Miniopterus manavi Thomas, 1906
- Collection localities of Miniopterus manavi

= Manavi long-fingered bat =

Bat in the genus Miniopterus from Madagascar

The Manavi long-fingered bat (Miniopterus manavi) is a bat in the genus Miniopterus that occurs in east-central Madagascar. First described in 1906, this species was later included in the mainland African M. minor. A 1995 revision united populations of small Miniopterus from Madagascar and the Comoros as M. manavi, but molecular and morphological studies in 2008 and 2009 showed that this concept of M. manavi in fact included five different species. M. manavi itself was restricted to a few locations in the eastern Central Highlands and populations in the Comoros and northern and western Madagascar were allocated to different species.

Miniopterus manavi is a small, blackish or reddish-brown Miniopterus; its forearm length is 37.6 to 39.2 mm (1.48 to 1.54 in). The tragus (a projection in the outer ear) is narrow and ends in an angular tip. The uropatagium (tail membrane) is well-furred and the palate is flat.

== Taxonomy ==
Miniopterus, a widespread genus of bats in Africa, southern Eurasia, and Australia, was first recorded from Madagascar by George Edward Dobson, who mentioned the larger Miniopterus schreibersii and the smaller M. scotinus (currently M. natalensis) in his 1878 catalog of the bats in the British Museum. In 1906, Oldfield Thomas named the larger species M. majori and the smaller M. manavi. He regarded M. manavi as close to the mainland African M. minor, and in 1971, R.W. Hayman and J.E. Hill placed it as a subspecies of that species. In their 1995 Faune de Madagascar review of Malagasy bats, however, Randolph Peterson and colleagues again separated M. manavi as a species, with M. manavi griveaudi (currently Miniopterus griveaudi) from Grande Comore as a subspecies. Peterson, who died before the review was completed, had originally divided M. manavi into several species occurring in different areas, but his collaborators decided conservatively to keep M. manavi as a single species, recommending reassessment of the status of those forms as new material would become available.

In the 2000s, molecular studies helped clarify the systematics of Miniopterus. In 2007, Javier Juste and colleagues, using sequences of the mitochondrial cytochrome b gene, found that bats from Madagascar (M. manavi), Grande Comore (M. manavi griveaudi) and São Tomé (M. minor newtoni; currently Miniopterus newtoni) did not cluster together to the exclusion of other African Miniopterus; however, their samples of "M. manavi" were in fact misidentified M. majori. The next year, Nicole Weyeneth and colleagues used cytochrome b and mitochondrial D-loop sequences to assess the relationships of Comoran Miniopterus. They found two unrelated clades within Malagasy and Comoran samples of "Miniopterus manavi", neither of which was closely related to M. newtoni or to Tanzanian samples of M. minor.

During 2009, Steven Goodman and colleagues published two papers that found a total of five genetically and morphologically distinct species within Miniopterus manavi as defined by Peterson and colleagues (1995), up to four of which can be found in a single locality. In order to determine the true identity of M. manavi, Goodman and Claude Maminirina obtained bats near the type locality of M. manavi (the site where the original material was collected, from which the species was described) for inclusion in the analysis; they also sequenced one of Thomas's original specimens. Among the five species they identified, M. griveaudi occurs on Grande Comore and Anjouan and in northern and western Madagascar; M. aelleni occurs on Anjouan and in northern and western Madagascar; M. brachytragos is found in northern Madagascar only; M. mahafaliensis is confined to the southwestern part of the island; and M. manavi itself is known only from the eastern edge of the Central Highlands. These five species are not each other's closest relatives according to analyses of cytochrome b sequences and their similarities reflect convergent evolution. Cytochrome b suggested that the closest relative of M. manavi is the slightly larger M. petersoni from southeastern Madagascar. Two specimens of M. manavi differed by 1.3% in their cytochrome b sequences and by 2.5% from M. petersoni.

== Description ==
Miniopterus manavi is a diminutive species with fur of medium length. The upperparts are blackish or reddish brown. Other small Malagasy Miniopterus are lighter. The ears mostly lack hair and end in a rounded tip. The tragus (a projection on the inner side of the outer ear) is thin for most of its length, ends in an angular tip, and has a flange at the medial side (towards the midline of the animal). The tragus is differently shaped in other species. The wings and uropatagium (tail membrane) are blackish and are attached to the upper leg at the same level, above the ankle. The uropatagium is densely haired above and more sparsely below, as in M. mahafaliensis and M. brachytragos; M. griveaudi and M. aelleni have more nearly naked uropatagia.

In the single specimen of true M. manavi that Goodman and colleagues could measure, total length is 90 mm (3.5 in), tail length is 39 mm (1.5 in), hindfoot length is 6 mm (0.24 in), tragus length is 6 mm (0.24 in), ear length is 10 mm (0.39 in), and body mass is 6.4 g (0.23 oz). The length of the forearm is known from four specimens; it ranges from 37.6 to 39.2 mm (1.48 to 1.54 in), averaging 38.5 mm (1.52 in).

In the skull, the rostrum (front part) is rounded. The central groove in the nasal depression is relatively narrow. The frontal bones are inflated and bear a prominent sagittal crest. Further back on the braincase, the lambdoid crest is poorly developed. The middle part of the palate is flat, not concave as in M. brachytragos, M. griveaudi, and M. mahafaliensis. At the palate's back margin is a short, thick posterior palatal spine.

== Distribution and ecology ==
The currently known distribution of M. manavi extends around the eastern margin of the Central Highlands, from the vicinity of Ambositra in the north to Vinanitelo in the south, at 900 to 1,500 m (3,000 to 4,900 ft) above sea level. The 2008 IUCN Red List assessed the species as "Least Concern", citing its wide distribution, though it is sometimes hunted for food. However, the account predates the recognition of M. aelleni, M. brachytragos, M. griveaudi, and M. mahafaliensis as separate species. It was confirmed in this status in the 2107 list. Although some ecological data about M. manavi have been published, these need to be reevaluated with the recognition of numerous additional species within M. manavi. Species of Miniopterus generally feed on insects, breed seasonally, and roost in large colonies in caves. The myobiid mite Calcarmyobia comoresensis has been recorded on M. manavi.

== Literature cited ==
- Dobson, G.E. (1878). Catalogue of the Chiroptera in the collections of the British Museum. London: British Museum.
- Goodman, S.M.; Maminirina, C.P.; Weyeneth, N.; Bradman, H.M.; Christidis, L.; Ruedi, M.; and Appleton, B. (2009). "The use of molecular and morphological characters to resolve the taxonomic identity of cryptic species: the case of Miniopterus manavi (Chiroptera: Miniopteridae)". Zoologica Scripta. 38 (4): 339–363. doi:10.1111/j.1463-6409.2008.00377.x.
- Goodman, S.M.; Maminirina, C.P.; Bradman, H.M.; Christidis, L.; and Appleton, B. (2009). "The use of molecular phylogenetic and morphological tools to identify cryptic and paraphyletic species: Examples from the diminutive long-fingered bats (Chiroptera: Miniopteridae: Miniopterus) on Madagascar". American Museum Novitates (3669): 1–34. doi:10.1206/652.1. hdl:2246/6028.
- Hill, J.E. (1993). "Long-fingered bats of the genus Miniopterus (Chiroptera: Vespertilionidae) from Madagascar". Mammalia. 57 (3): 401–405. doi:10.1515/mamm.1993.57.3.401.
- Juste, J.; Ferrández, A.; Fa, J.E.; Masefield, W.; and Ibáñez, C. (2007). "Taxonomy of little bentwinged bats (Miniopterus, Miniopteridae) from the African islands of São Tomé, Grand Comoro and Madagascar, based on mtDNA". Acta Chiropterologica. 9: 27–37. doi:10.3161/1733-5329(2007)9[27:TOLBBM]2.0.CO;2. hdl:10261/48651.
- Nowak, R.M. (1994). Walker's Bats of the Old World. Baltimore: The Johns Hopkins University Press. ISBN 978-0-8018-4986-2.
- Thomas, O. (1906). "New African mammals of the genera Cercopithecus, Scotophilus, Miniopterus, Crocidura, Georychus, and Heliophobius". Annals and Magazine of Natural History. 7 (17): 173–179. doi:10.1080/00222930608562508.
- Uchikawa, K. (1985). "Calcarmyobia from the Ethiopian region (Acarina, Myobiidae)". Bulletin of the British Museum (Natural History), Zoology Series. 48 (1): 45–55. doi:10.5962/p.23461.
- Weyeneth, N.; Goodman, S.M.; Stanley, W.T.; and Ruedi, M. (2008). "The biogeography of Miniopterus bats (Chiroptera: Miniopteridae) from the Comoro Archipelago inferred from mitochondrial DNA". Molecular Ecology. 17 (24): 5205–5219. Bibcode:2008MolEc..17.5205W. doi:10.1111/j.1365-294X.2008.03994.x. PMID 19067798.
