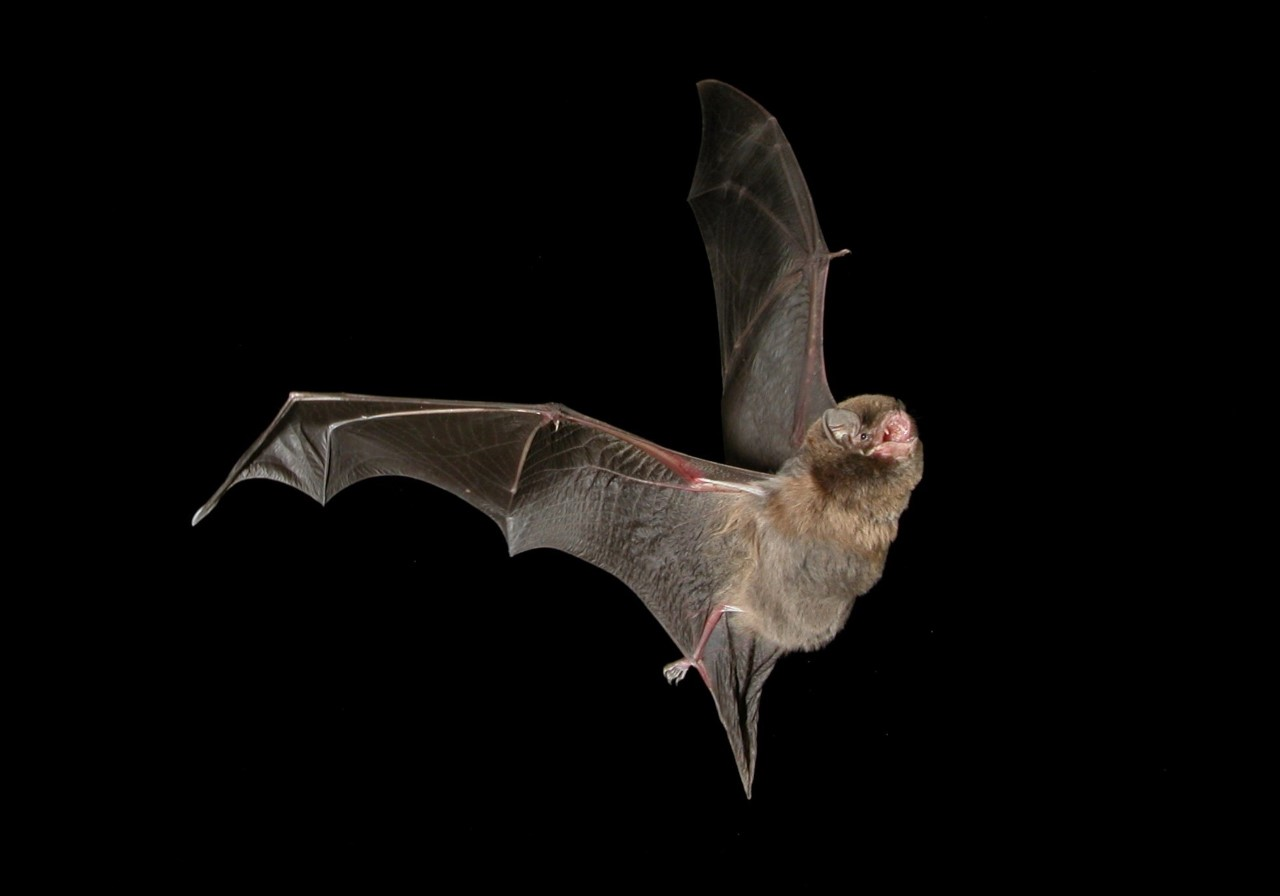

Scientific classification
- Kingdom: Animalia
- Phylum: Chordata
- Class: Mammalia
- Order: Chiroptera
- Family: Miniopteridae
- Genus: Miniopterus
- Species: M. orianae

Binomial name
- Miniopterus orianae Thomas, 1922

= Australasian bent-wing bat =

Species of vesper bat

The Australasian bent-wing bat (Miniopterus orianae) is a species of vesper bat in the family Miniopteridae. It is found in Australia and in Southeast Asia.

== Taxonomy ==
The Australasian bent-wing bat was described as a new species in 1922 by British zoologist Oldfield Thomas. The holotype had been collected on 9 July 1922 by Oriana F. Wilson, widow of Antarctic explorer Edward Adrian Wilson. Thomas named the species Miniopterus orianae. This species was once considered a subspecies of common bent-wing bat. It is now accepted that the Australasian bent-winged bat and the Eastern bent-winged bat are two distinct species.

The Australasian bent-wing bat has three subspecies: M. orianae bassanii (the southern bent-wing bat), M. o. orianae (the northern bent-wing bat), and M. o. oceanensis (the eastern bent-wing bat).

== Ecology ==
It is known to harbor the blood parasite Polychromophilus melanipherus, though one study found that bats with the blood parasite did not appear to suffer deleterious effects such as anemia or low body weight.

== Range and habitat ==
M. orianae bassanii only occurs in southwestern Victoria and southeastern South Australia. M. orianae oceanensis occurs widely along the east coast of Australia. M. orianae orianae was first documented in Casurina Bay, which is 17 mi (27 km) from Darwin, Northern Territory.

== Conservation ==
One of the subspecies (M. orianae bassanii) has been evaluated as critically endangered in Australia under the Environment Protection and Biodiversity Conservation Act 1999 since 2007. M. orianae oceanensis is listed as vulnerable in Victoria, as it is only known from one maternity cave.
