= Tragal pressure =

Pressure applied to the front of the ear canal

Tragal pressure is pressure that is applied to the cartilage at the front, or anterior aspect of the ear canal (called the tragus), closing the canal and increasing pressure on the tympanic membrane (ear drum).

Tragal pumping is the act of repeatedly applying tragal pressure in quick succession to help deliver ear drops deeper into the ear canal.
