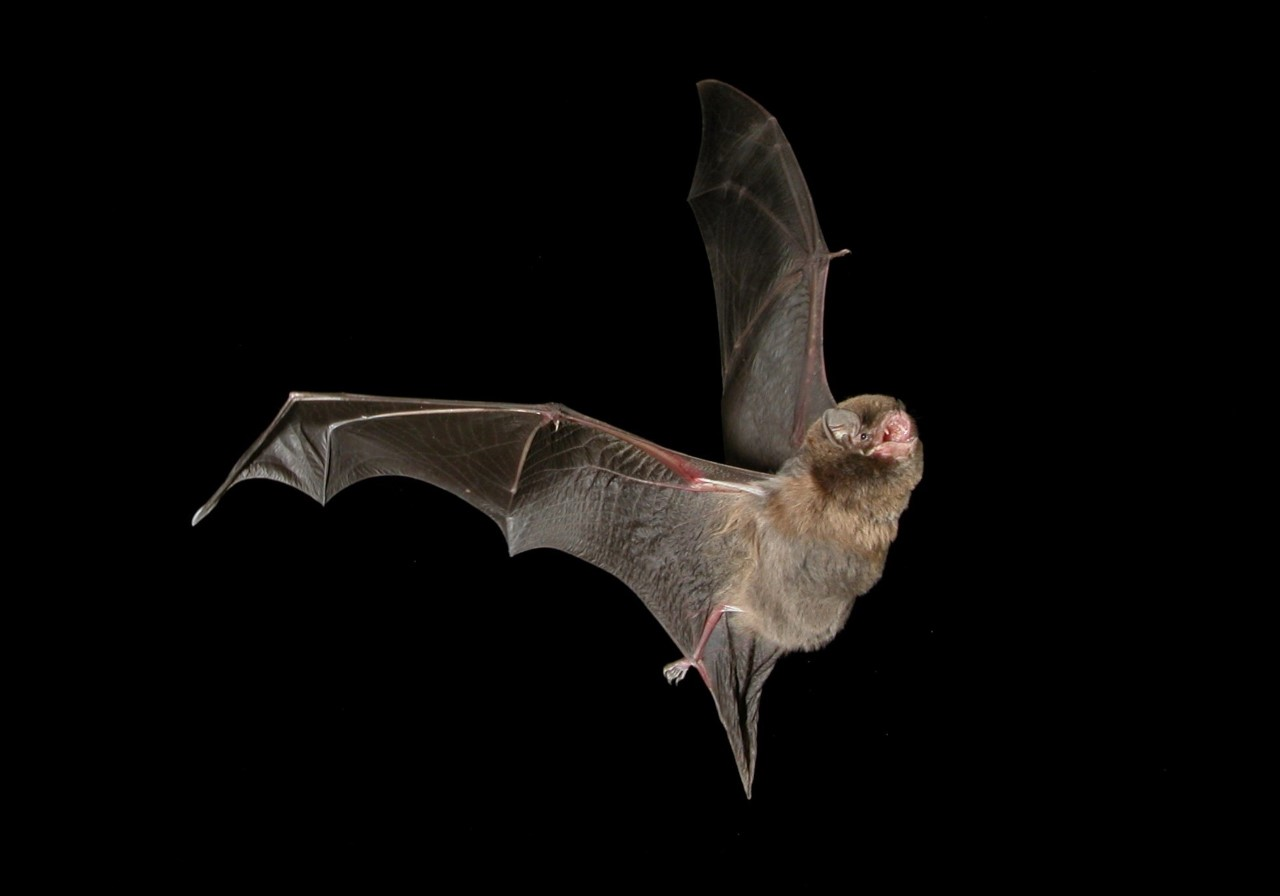

Conservation status
- Critically endangered (EPBC Act)

Scientific classification
- Kingdom: Animalia
- Phylum: Chordata
- Class: Mammalia
- Order: Chiroptera
- Family: Miniopteridae
- Genus: Miniopterus
- Species: M. orianae
- Subspecies: M. o. bassanii

Trinomial name
- Miniopterus orianae bassanii (Cardinal & Christidis, 2000)

= Southern bent-wing bat =

Subspecies of bat

The southern bent-wing bat (Miniopterus orianae bassanii) is one of two subspecies of the Australasian bent-wing bat. Its population size has declined rapidly since the 1950s, and it is classified as critically endangered by the Australian government.

== Taxonomy ==
In 2000, the common bent-wing bat of Australia was revised into three subspecies, including the southern bent-wing bat. However, it is now recognized as a subspecies of the Australasian bent-wing bat (Miniopterus orianae). There is evidence to suggest that it is reproductively isolated from the other Australian subspecies, and warrants elevation to its own species based on genetics.

=== Etymology ===
The subspecies name is derived from the border between this subspecies and the eastern bent-wing bat, the Bassian volcanic plains.

== Description ==
The southern bent-wing bat is slightly larger than the other two subspecies of bent-wing bats in Australia. It has an average weight of 15.7g and average forearm length of 47.6mm. It roosts in caves and rock crevices. Its range is restricted to southeastern South Australia and southwestern Victoria. Their lifespans can be at least 20 years, as determined by the recapture of banded bats.

=== Reproduction ===
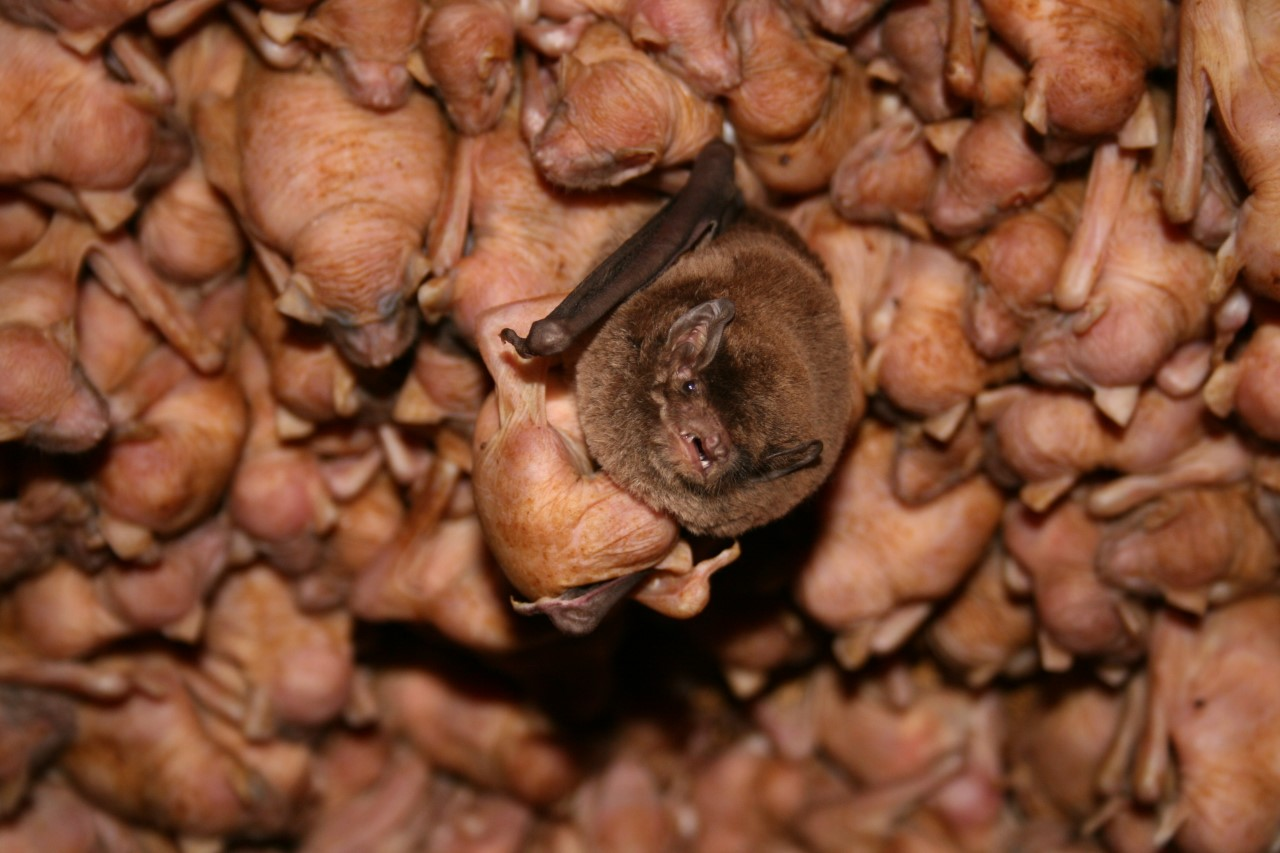

Mating occurs in the autumn, but the embryo doesn't begin to grow until the spring due to delayed implantation. Females do not reproduce until their second year. The offspring, called pups, are born at 20% of their adult size, and reach full size by ten weeks of age. Southern bent-wing bats rely heavily on cave structure, choosing caves that allow high heat and humidity, which promotes development of their young, which are born hairless. The pups begin learning to fly at seven weeks old.

== Conservation ==
The southern bent-wing bat is one of only five mammals in Australia to have the designation critically endangered; listing occurred in 2007. During the summer breeding season, most of the species now forms maternity colonies in two caves, Bat Cave in Naracoorte Caves National Park and Starlight Cave in Warrnambool. The Naracoorte site hosted up to 200,000 individuals in the 1950s and 1960s, but in 2009, there were an estimated 20,000 individuals. An immense breeding colony once existed at the Widderin caces near Skipton, as the Chief Protector of Aborigines in Victoria, George Augustus Robinson, discovered in the mid 1840s. That habitat ceased to function as a colony by the late 1860s.

=== Reasons for decline ===
One possible cause of the species decline is climate change. In December 2006, over three hundred dead or dying bats were on the floor of Bat Cave, with other emaciated individuals still hanging on the walls. The cause of this mortality was attributed to lack of insects due to drought, in addition to a record number of cold nights that further suppressed insect activity. There has also been a significant decrease in genetic variation in recent years, which could cause further decline of the subspecies. Another possible cause of decline of this subspecies is guano mining in Australia, which frequently involved changing the shapes of caves to make extraction easier. Guano mining changed the cave environments by lowering their humidity, which possibly made them inhospitable to bat colonies. It is unknown if pesticide or heavy metal exposure is contributing to the decline of this subspecies, although DDT and its related compounds DDD and DDE have been found in their guano, livers, pectoral muscles, brains, and fat tissues.

=== Future threats ===
A major concern for conservation of this subspecies is the potential arrival of white-nose syndrome, which has killed millions of bats in North America since its introduction in 2007. A risk assessment stated that it was "Almost Certain" that white-nose syndrome would arrive in Australia by 2027. While many caves in Australia would be too warm for the cold-loving fungus that causes white-nose syndrome, the caves in southern Australia are colder and suitable for growth of the fungus. The risk assessment predicted that of all cave-roosting bat species in Australia, the arrival of white-nose syndrome would have the most severe effect on the southern bent-wing bat.

=== Management actions ===
Fences have been placed outside of Bat Cave to deter foxes and rabbits from entering. Totally closing off cave entrances with bat-accessible gates, while effective for managing some species, is not effective for this subspecies, as it avoids caves with gates. Human access to Bat Cave is strictly regulated to minimize disturbance to the maternity colony, but Starlight Cave is on private land and therefore less protected. Most critically, researchers are seeking to determine what is responsible for the drastic decline of the subspecies, so more focused conservation actions can be implemented.
