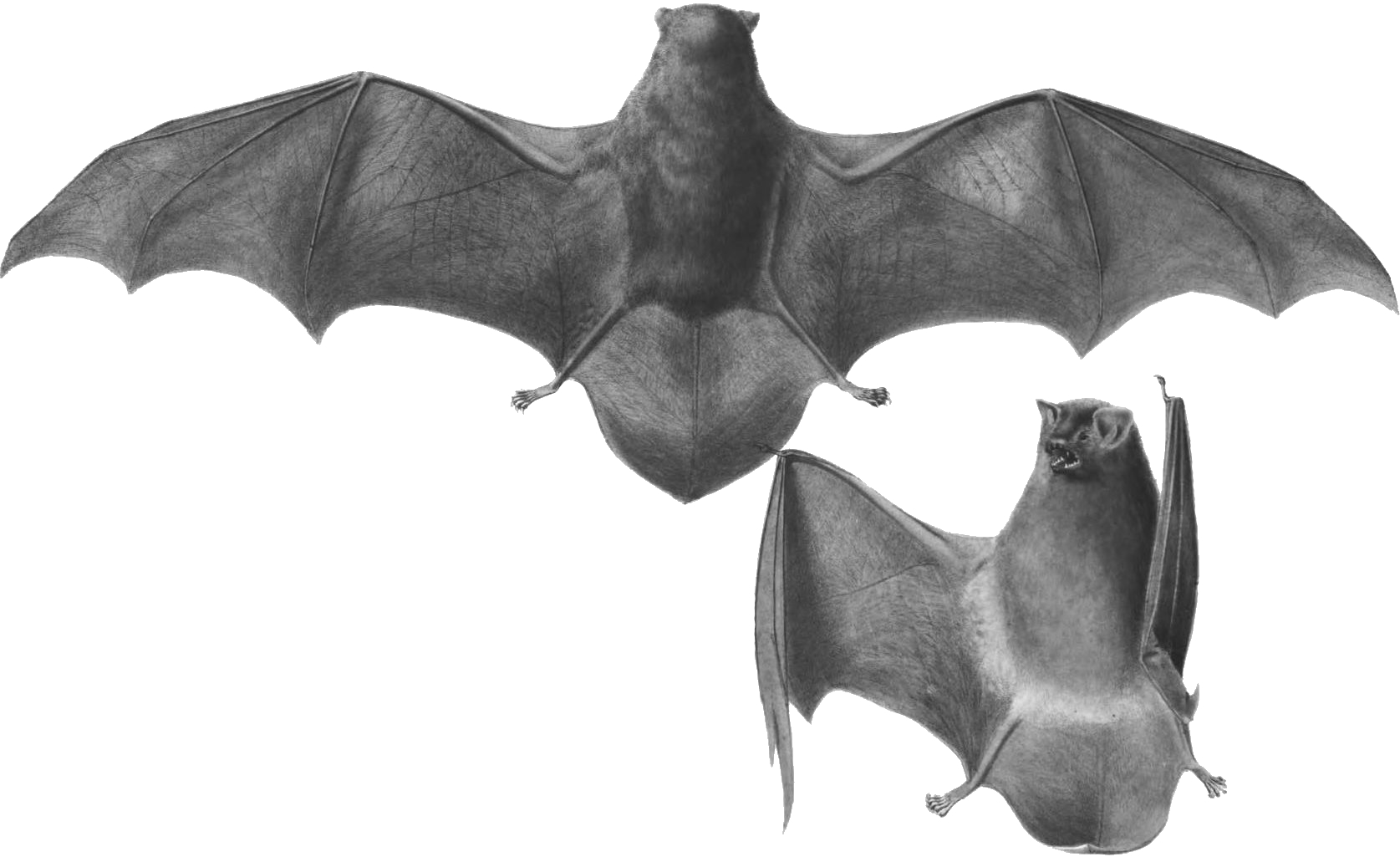

Conservation status
- Vulnerable (IUCN 3.1)

Scientific classification
- Kingdom: Animalia
- Phylum: Chordata
- Class: Mammalia
- Order: Chiroptera
- Family: Miniopteridae
- Genus: Miniopterus
- Species: M. schreibersii

Binomial name
- Miniopterus schreibersii (Kuhl, 1817)

= Common bent-wing bat =

Species of mammal

The common bent-wing bat (Miniopterus schreibersii), also known as the Schreibers's long-fingered bat or Schreibers's bat, is a species of insectivorous bat. They appear to have dispersed from a subtropical origin and distributed throughout the southern Palearctic, Ethiopic, Oriental, and Australian regions. In Europe, it is present in the southern half on the continent from Iberia to the Caucasus, with the largest populations found in the warmer Mediterranean area. The common and scientific names honor Carl Franz Anton Ritter von Schreibers.

== Taxonomy ==
There are 11 recognised subspecies of the common bent-winged bat:

- Miniopterus schreibersii schreibersii
- Miniopterus schreibersii blepotis
- Miniopterus schreibersii chinensis
- Miniopterus schreibersii dasythrix
- Miniopterus schreibersii eschscholtzii
- Miniopterus schreibersii haradai
- Miniopterus schreibersii japoniae
- Miniopterus schreibersii orsinii
- Miniopterus schreibersii parvipes
- Miniopterus schreibersii smitianus
- Miniopterus schreibersii villiersi

Three former subspecies that were included in M.scheibersii have now been given species status. They are Miniopterus pallidus (pale bent-wing bat), Miniopterus fuliginosus (eastern bent-wing bat), and Miniopterus orianae (Australasian bent-wing bat). The Southern bent-wing bat (foremerly M. schreibersii bassanii) is considered a subspecies of M. orianae.

== Roosting ==
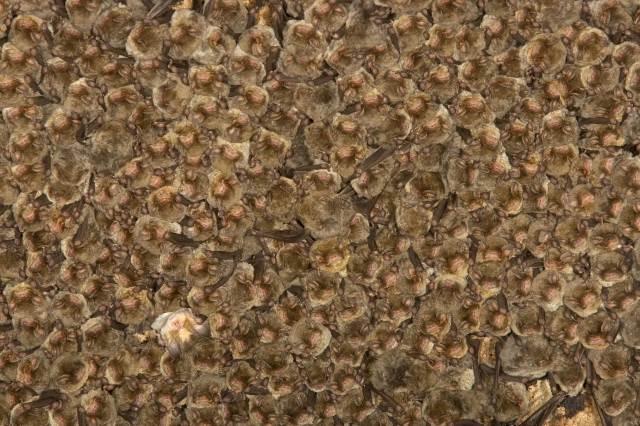
Colony of common bent-wing bats hanging in a cluster

The common bent-wing bat is a bat that forms major colonies and the longest period of torpor (hibernation) observed was about 12 days. These colonies can range anywhere from a few dozen or several million bats. Most of these colonies are formed in large caves or mines but they can also be found in other areas such as tunnels or ruins or other man made sites. In these roosting sites the common bent-wing bat establishes its colony in a "bell-shaped" hollow, which traps body heat and raises the temperature of the roost higher than the surrounding portions of the cave. This method of trapping warmth is used to reduce energy loss from shivering. Also, they will often enter hollows through small openings in order to better secure themselves from large predators during torpor. The common bent-wing bat migrates multiple times a year depending on weather of the roosting area; the length of these migrations can vary but the longest migration recorded was 833 km.

== Threats ==
The common bent-wing bat is categorized as "vulnerable" according to the International Union for Conservation of Nature. The explanation for the recent cause of these deaths is unknown but there have been many speculations as to why the mortality rate for this bat has increased. Researchers in Europe believe that the loss of underground habitats, the disturbance of their habitats, and pesticide use have caused an increase in deaths for the common bent-wing bat. In Australia, researchers suspect that the high tissue levels of DDT (Dichlorodiphenyltrichloroethane) they found in the common bent-wing bat, including the young ones that had not left the maternity roosts, was the cause of these deaths.

== Distribution ==
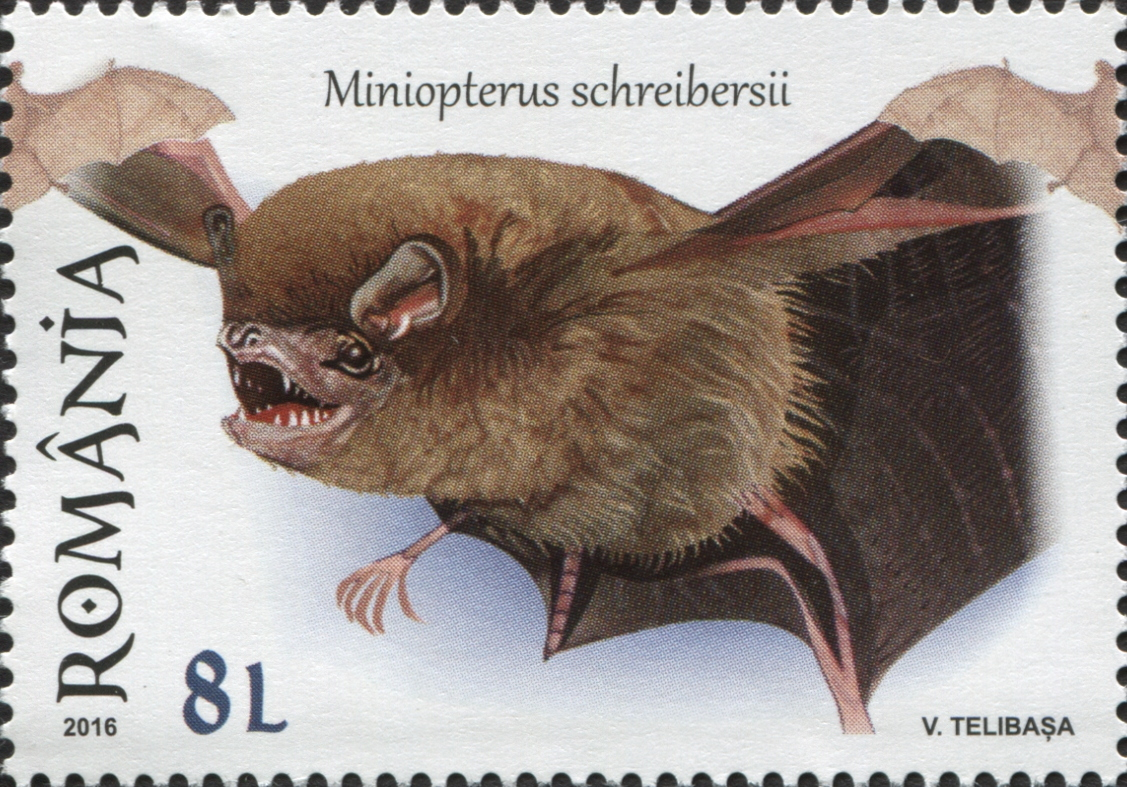
Common bent-wing bat on a 2016 stamp of Romania

The common bent-wing bat can be found in the following countries:Afghanistan, Albania, Algeria, Armenia, Australia, Austria, Azerbaijan, Bosnia and Herzegovina, Bulgaria, Cameroon, China, Croatia, Cyprus, possibly Ethiopia, France, Georgia, Gibraltar, Greece, Guinea, Hungary, India, Indonesia, Iran, Iraq, Israel, Italy, Japan, Jordan, possibly Kenya, North Korea, South Korea, Laos, Lebanon, Liberia, Libya, Malaysia, Malta, Montenegro, Morocco, Myanmar, Nepal, Nigeria, North Macedonia, Pakistan, Palestine, Papua New Guinea, Philippines, Portugal, Romania, Russian Federation, San Marino, Saudi Arabia, Serbia, Sierra Leone, Slovakia, Slovenia, South Africa, Solomon Islands, Spain, Sri Lanka, Switzerland, Syrian Arab Republic, Taiwan, Tajikistan, Thailand, Tunisia, Turkey, Turkmenistan, Vietnam, and Yemen.

The bat appears to have become established for the first time in Poland in 2018 indicating a northerly expansion despite a trend in decreasing population in Europe.
