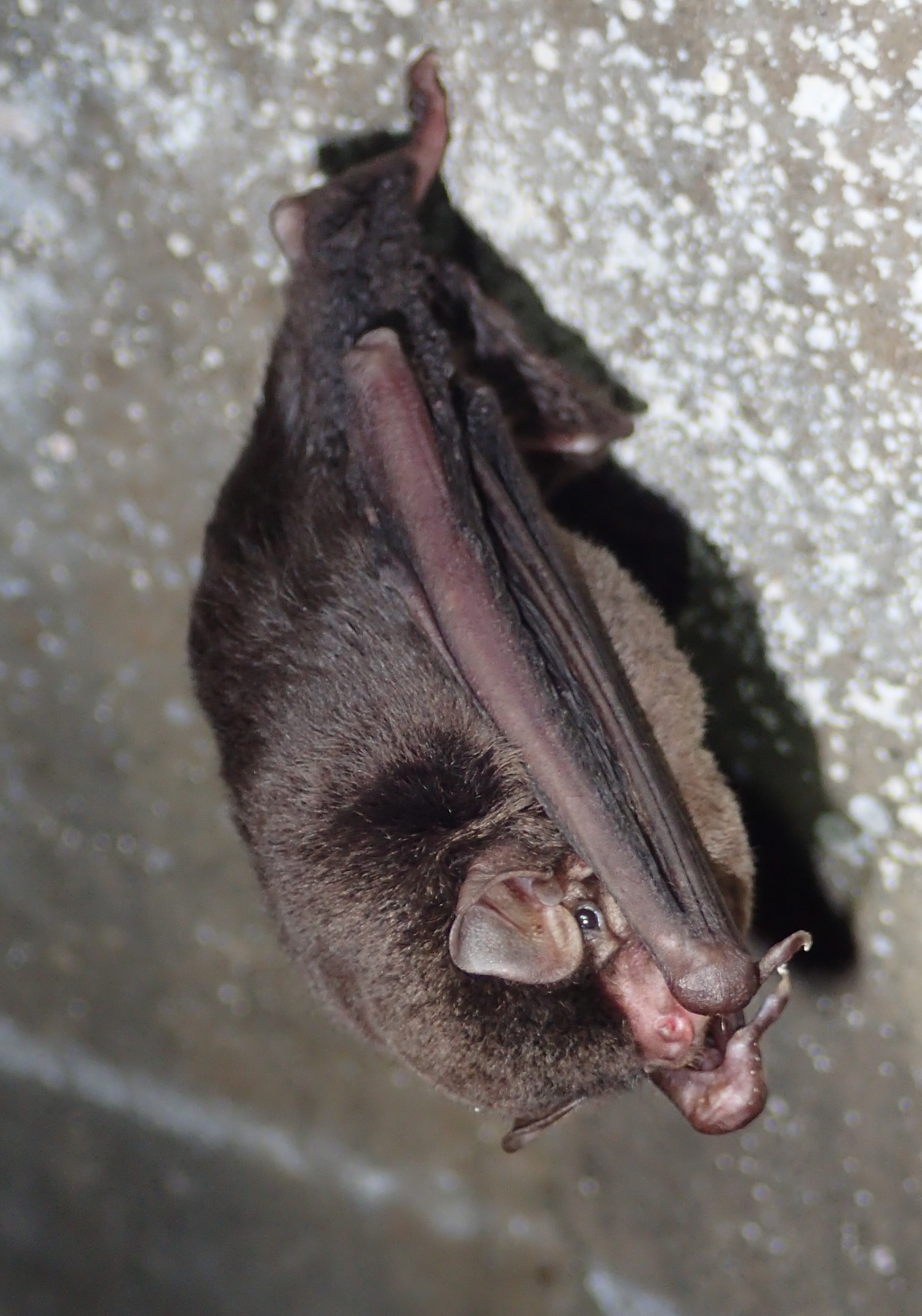

Scientific classification
- Kingdom: Animalia
- Phylum: Chordata
- Class: Mammalia
- Infraclass: Placentalia
- Order: Chiroptera
- Family: Miniopteridae
- Genus: Miniopterus
- Species: M. fuliginosus

Binomial name
- Miniopterus fuliginosus Hodgson, 1835

= Eastern bent-wing bat =

Species of bat

The eastern bent-wing bat (Miniopterus fuliginosus) is a species of vesper bat in the family Miniopteridae. It is found in South Asia, Far-east Asia, the east Caucasus Mountains and also in Southeast Asian regions.

== Description ==
They exhibit long and narrow wings, high wingspans and low wing loadings, which enable quick and long flights. Head and body length is 10 to 11 centimetres (3.9 to 4.3 in) and the forearms are 4 to 5 centimetres (1.6 to 2.0 in) long with a wingspan of 30 to 31 centimetres (12 to 12 in).

Color varies from reddish brown to dark blackish brown above, with the underparts being lighter. The wing membrane is blackish brown. Fur is dense and soft, long above and short below. The ears are small and the cheeks are hairless below the eyes.

Zhang Jiang Lu et al. 2018 reported that echolocation frequencies were very similar among Eastern bent-wing bat colonies and variation in echolocation calls were likely due to variations in background noise instead of genetic drift.

== Taxonomy ==
This species was once considered a subspecies of the common bent-wing bat, but now it has been accepted that the eastern bent-winged bat and Australasian bent-winged bat are two separate species.
