= Tragus (ear) =

Eminence of the external ear

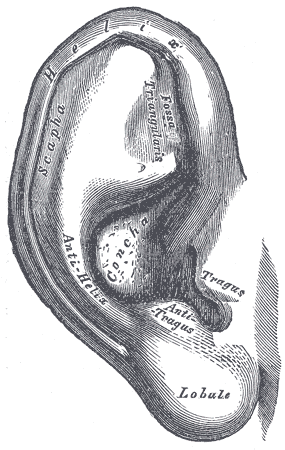
- The ear — lateral surface

Details
- Part of: External ear

Identifiers
- Latin: tragus
- TA98: A15.3.01.017
- TA2: 111
- FMA: 60998

The tragus is a small pointed eminence of the external ear, situated in front of the concha, and projecting backward over the meatus. It also is the name of hair growing at the entrance of the ear. Its name comes from the Ancient Greek tragos (τράγος), meaning 'goat', and is descriptive of its general covering on its under surface with a tuft of hair, resembling a goat's beard. The nearby antitragus projects forwards and upwards.

Because the tragus faces rearwards, it aids in collecting sounds from behind. These sounds are delayed more than sounds arriving from the front, assisting the brain to sense front vs. rear sound sources.

In a positive fistula test (for the presence of a fistula from cholesteatoma to the labyrinth), pressure on the tragus causes vertigo or eye deviation by inducing movement of perilymph.

== Other animals ==
The tragus is a key feature in many bat species. As a piece of skin in front of the ear canal, it plays an important role in directing sounds into the ear for prey location and navigation via echolocation. Because the tragus tends to be prominent in bats, it is an important feature in identifying bat species. The tragus allows echolocating bat species to vertically discriminate the objects around them, which is key to identifying where prey items and obstacles are in three-dimensional space. In studies where an individual's tragi are temporarily glued out of their normal positions, the bat's navigational acuity is one-fourth as effective as individuals with unmodified tragi. Based on this study, the authors concluded that the tragus's function is to create acoustic cues to determine the direction of a target in the vertical plane. Not all echolocating bats possess tragi, however. Horseshoe bats are one such family; the way in which the outer bottom edge of the ear folds in on itself is thought to function in a similar way to the tragus in other families.

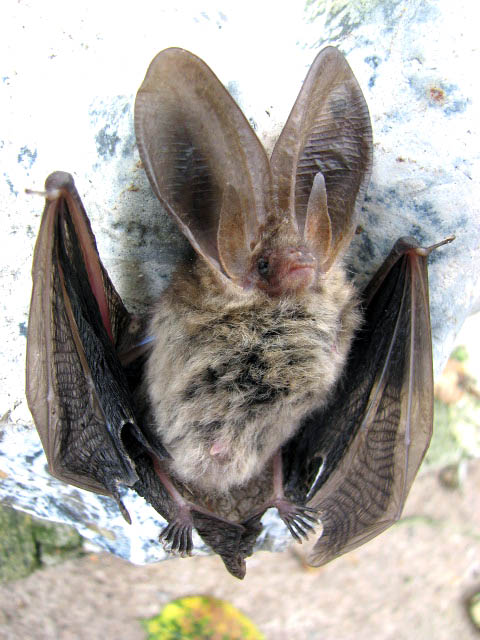
The long tragus of the brown long-eared bat

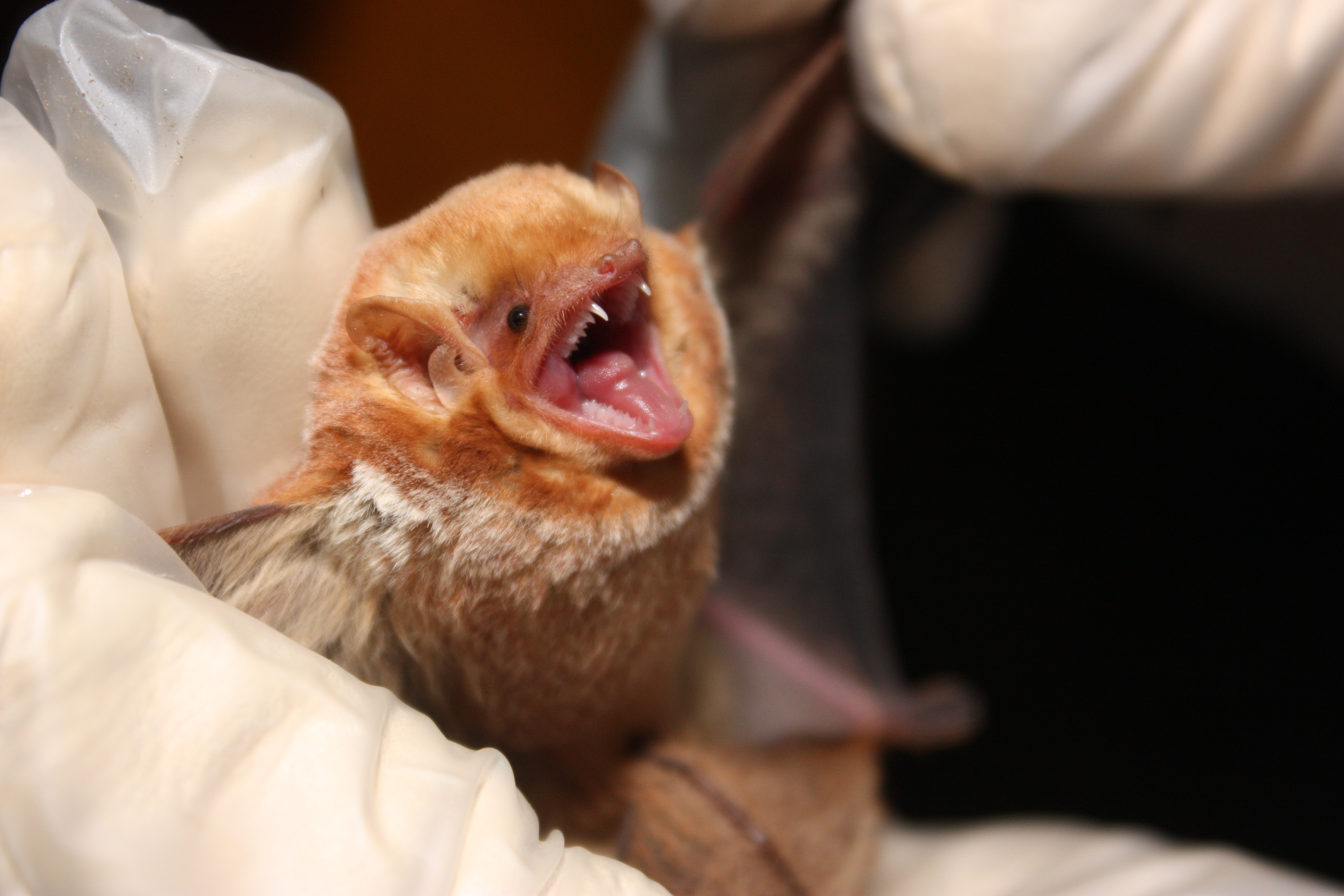
The curved tragus of the eastern red bat

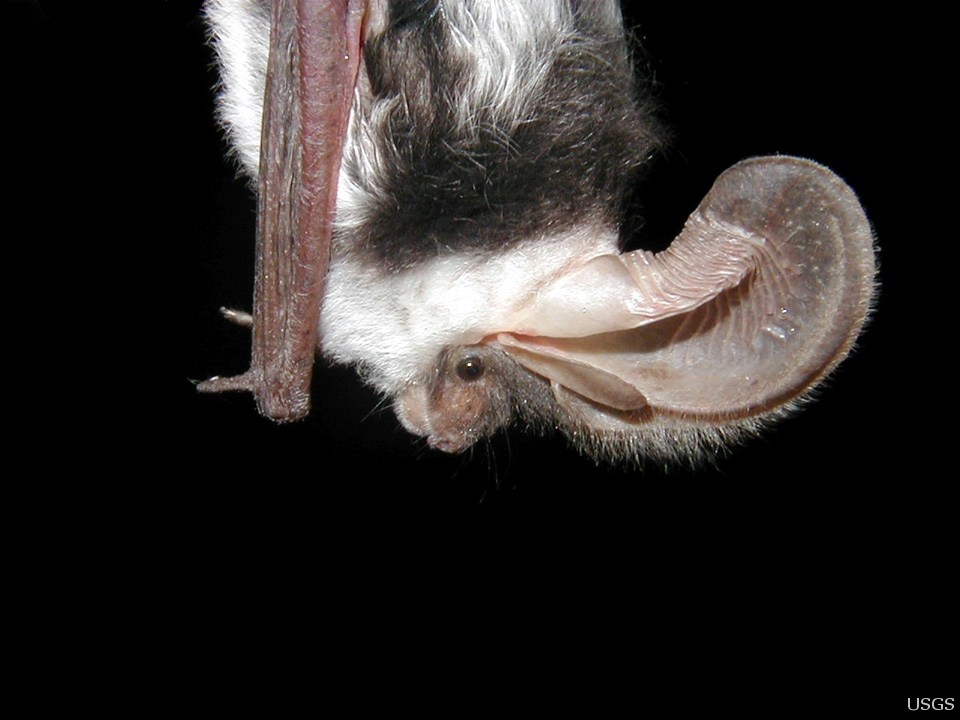
The blunt tragus of the spotted bat

== Additional images ==
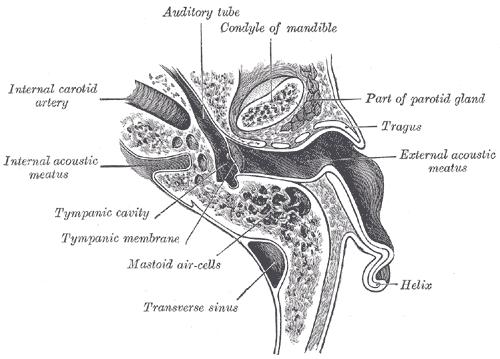
Horizontal section through left ear; upper half of section.

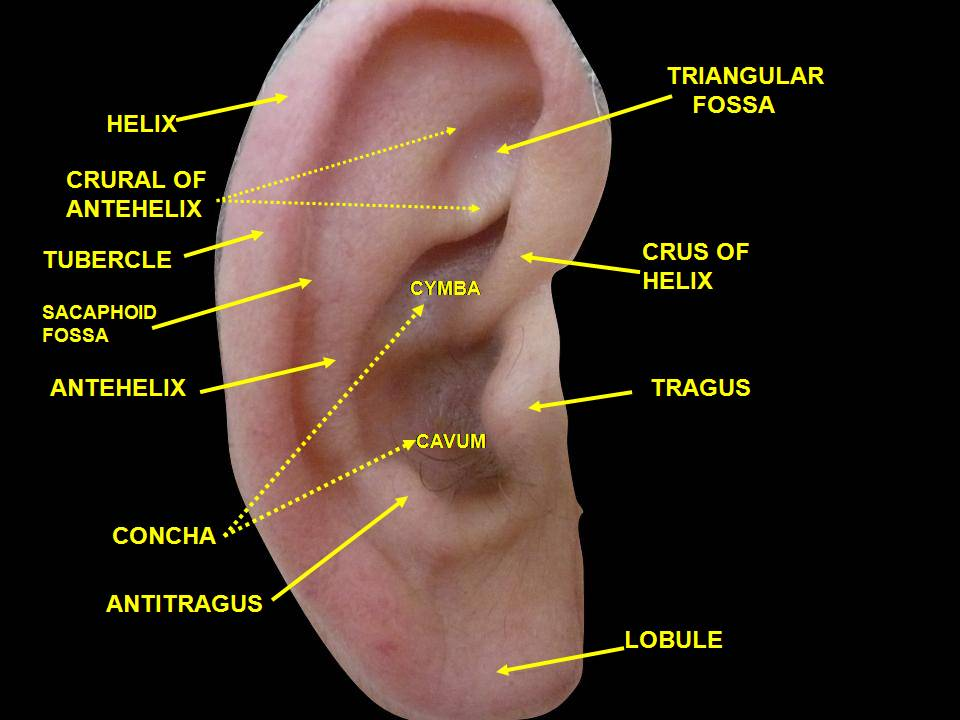
External ear. Right auricle. Lateral view.

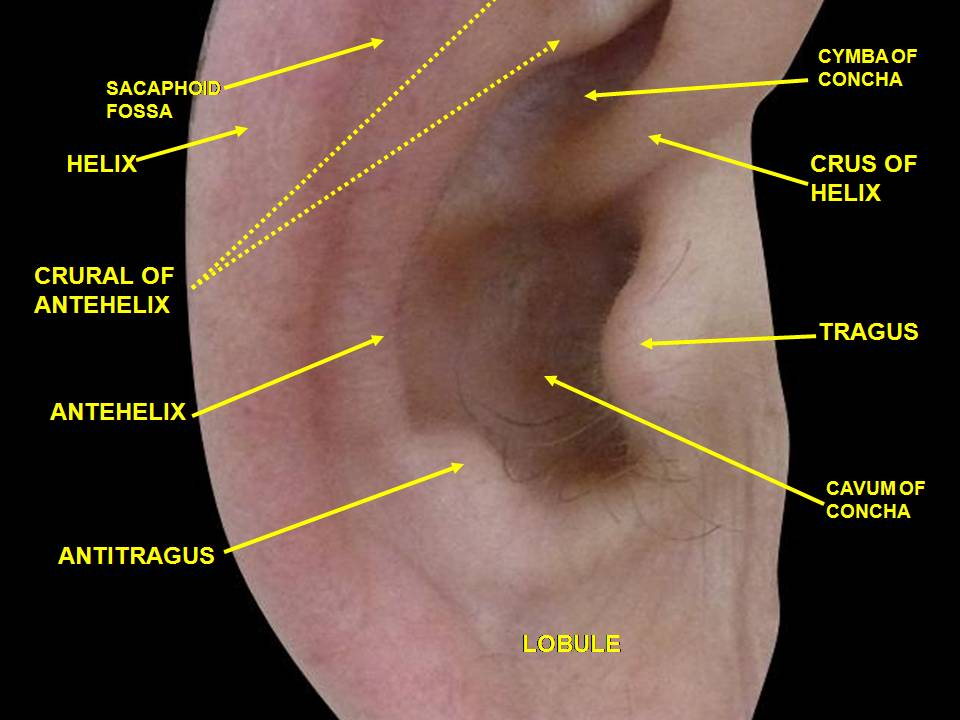
External ear. Right auricle. Lateral view.

== See also ==
- Auricular branch of the vagus nerve
- Tragal pressure
- Tragus piercing
